= List of Arceuthobium species =

List of dwarf mistletoe species

Arceuthobium is a genus of parasitic plants in the sandalwood family commonly known as dwarf mistletoes. Most species of Arceuthobium specialize on a small number of conifer species, on which they grow and from which they derive water and nutrients; host preference has been considered taxonomically important by most botanists.

The taxonomy of this genus is difficult to resolve. As with many other parasites, Arceuthobium plants have reduced morphological features (for example, minute, scale-like leaves) that make taxa difficult to distinguish morphologically. Phylogenetic studies have also revealed little genetic differentiation between species in several of the taxonomic sections, including Globosa, Rubra, Vaginata, and Campylopoda, indicating that species boundaries in these groups may still be forming. Nevertheless, some monophyletic clades have been identified even in these sections. Ultimately, modern treatments of the genus vary widely, including as many as 38 species or as few as 26 species, with Campylopoda in particular comprising between one and thirteen species.

This list summarizes the taxa currently recognized by Plants of the World Online, organized using the subgenera and sections from Nickrent et al. (2004). The taxonomy of the New World species (subgenus Vaginata) largely follows Kenaley and Mathiasen (2025).

== Subgenus Arceuthobium ==
=== Section Arceuthobium ===
- Arceuthobium juniperi-procerae Chiovenda (Parasite of Juniperus)
- Arceuthobium oxycedri (DC) Bieb. (Parasite of Juniperus)
- Arceuthobium tibetense H.S. Kiu & W. Ren (Parasite of Abies forrestii)

=== Section Chinense Nickrent ===
- Arceuthobium chinense Lecomte
- Arceuthobium minutissimum J.D: Hooker
- Arceuthobium sicuanense (H.S. Kiu) D. Hawksw. & Wiens
- Arceuthobium pini D. Hawksw. & Wiens

=== Section Azorica ===
- Arceuthobium azoricum (Parasite of Juniperus brevifolia)

== Subgenus Vaginata ==
=== Section Americana Nickrent ===
- Arceuthobium abietis-religiosae Hiel
- Arceuthobium americanum Nutt. Ex Engelm. (Parasite of Pinus banksiana, P. contorta var. latifolia and P. contorta var. murrayana)
- Arceuthobium verticilliflorum Engelm. (The only species lacking explosive seed dehiscence)

=== Section Penda Nickrent ===
- Arceuthobium guatemalense D. Hawksw. & Wiens (Parasite of Pinus ayacahuite. Also the most endangered Arceuthobium due to extensive logging in Guatemala)
- Arceuthobium pendens D. Hawksw. & Wiens (Parasite of piñyon pines)

=== Section Globosa Nickrent ===
- Arceuthobium globosum D. Hawksw. & Wiens
  - Arceuthobium globosum subsp. globosum
  - Arceuthobium globosum subsp. aureum (D. Hawksw. & Wiens) Mathiasen
  - Arceuthobium globosum subsp. grandicaule D. Hawksw. & Wiens
  - Arceuthobium globosum subsp. petersonii (D. Hawksw. & Wiens) Mathiasen

=== Section Pusilla Nickrent ===
- Arceuthobium bicarinatum Urb.
- Arceuthobium pusillum Peck

=== Section Rubra D. Hawksw. & Wiens ===
- Arceuthobium gillii D. Hawksw. & Wiens
- Arceuthobium nigrum D. Hawksw. & Wiens
- Arceuthobium rubrum D. Hawksw. & Wiens including: A. oaxacanum D. Hawksw. & Wiens
- Arceuthobium yecorense D. Hawksw. & Wiens

=== Section Vaginata D. Hawksw. & Wiens ===
This section has the broadest range of host species, parasitizing 20 species of Pinus.

- Arceuthobium hondurense D. Hawksw. & Wiens
  - Arceuthobium hondurense subsp. hondurense
  - Arceuthobium hondurense subsp. hawksworthii (Wiens & Shaw) Mathiasen
- Arceuthobium strictum D. Hawksw. & Wiens
- Arceuthobium vaginatum (Willd.) Presl.
  - Arceuthobium vaginatum subsp. vaginatum
  - Arceuthobium vaginatum subsp. cryptopodum (Engelm.) D. Hawksw. & Wiens
  - Arceuthobium vaginatum subsp. durangense D. Hawksw. & Wiens

=== Section Minuta D. Hawksw. & Wiens ===
- Arceuthobium divaricatum Engelm. (Parasite of piñyon pines)
- Arceuthobium douglasii Engelm. (Parasite of Pseudotsuga menziesii, occasionally Abies grandis and Picea engelmannii)

=== Section Campylopoda D. Hawksw. & Wiens ===
- Arceuthobium abietinum D. Hawksw. & Wiens
  - Arceuthobium abietinum var. abietinum
  - Arceuthobium abietinum var. grandae (Kenaley) Tiehm
  - Arceuthobium abietinum var. magnificae (Mathiasen & Kenaley) Tiehm
  - Arceuthobium abietinum var. mathiasenii (Kenaley) Tiehm
  - Arceuthobium abietinum var. wiensii (Mathiasen & C.M Daugherty) Tiehm
- Arceuthobium apachecum D. Hawksw. & Wiens
- Arceuthobium blumeri A. Nelson
- Arceuthobium californicum D. Hawksw. & Wiens
- Arceuthobium cyanocarpum (A. Nelson ex Rydberg) Coulter & Nelson
- Arceuthobium campylopodum Engelm.
- Arceuthobium laricis (Piper) St. John
- Arceuthobium littorum D. Hawksw., Wiens & Nickrent
- Arceuthobium microcarpum (Engelm.) Hawksworth & Wiens
  - Arceuthobium microcarpum subsp. microcarpum
  - Arceuthobium microcarpum subsp. aristatae J.M. Scott & Mathiasen
- Arceuthobium monticola D. Hawksw., Wiens & Nickrent
- Arceuthobium occidentale Engelm.
- Arceuthobium siskiyouense D. Hawksw., Wiens & Nickrent
- Arceuthobium tsugense (Rosendahl) G.N. Jones
  - Arceuthobium tsugense subsp. tsugense
  - Arceuthobium tsugense subsp. amabilae Mathiasen & C.M. Daugherty
  - Arceuthobium tsugense subsp. contortae Wass & Mathiasen
  - Arceuthobium tsugense subsp. mertensianae Hawksworth & Nickrent
