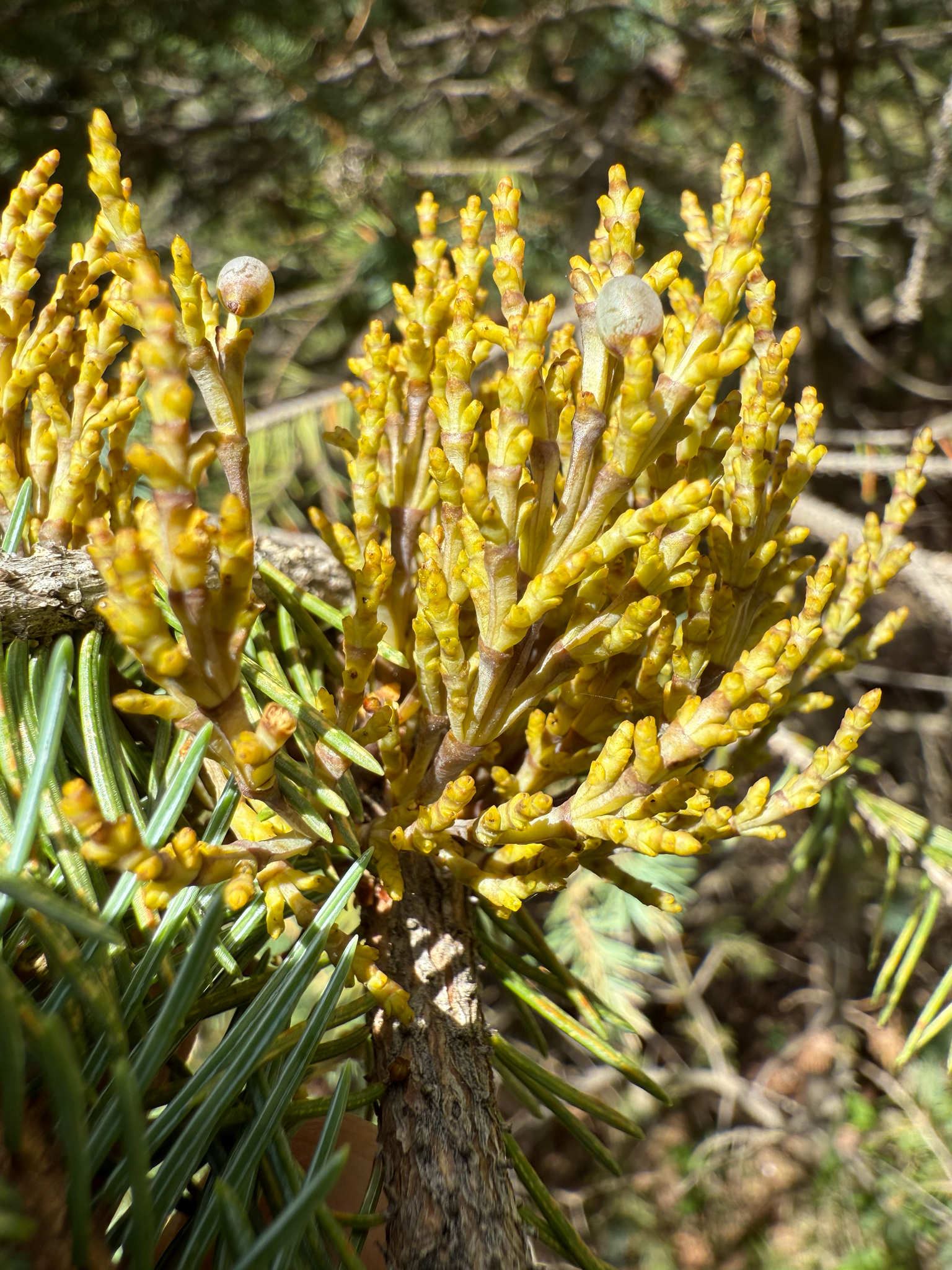

Scientific classification
- Kingdom: Plantae
- Clade: Embryophytes
- Clade: Tracheophytes
- Clade: Spermatophytes
- Clade: Angiosperms
- Clade: Eudicots
- Order: Santalales
- Family: Santalaceae
- Genus: Arceuthobium
- Species: A. microcarpum

Binomial name
- Arceuthobium microcarpum (Engelm.) Hawksw. & Wiens

Synonyms
- Arceuthobium douglasii var. microcarpum Engelm. in Rothr.; Arceuthobium campylopodum subsp. microcarpum (Engelm.) Nickrent; Razoumofskya microcarpa (Engelm.) Wooton & Standl.

= Arceuthobium microcarpum =

Species of dwarf mistletoe

Arceuthobium microcarpum is a species of flowering plant in the family Santalaceae endemic to the coniferous forests of Arizona and New Mexico. As with other species of dwarf mistletoe, A. microcarpum parasitizes several species of conifers, relying on the host plant for water and nutrients. There are two subspecies: A. microcarpum subsp. microcarpum, commonly known as western spruce dwarf mistletoe, which parasitizes spruce trees, and A. microcarpum subsp. aristatae, commonly known as bristlecone pine dwarf mistletoe, which parasitizes bristlecone pine trees. Because of its extremely limited range, A. microcarpum is considered an imperiled species.

A. microcarpum significantly impacts the ecology of the coniferous forests, including by reducing the vitality, reproductive rate, and lifespan of host trees. They induce the formation of abnormal growths called witch's brooms in their host trees, which serve as microhabitats for wildlife. A. microcarpum also serves as a food source for birds and mammals and is itself parasitized two species of fungus.

Since its discovery in 1873, taxonomists have placed A. microcarpum under several names, and its taxonomy remains controversial. Some authorities, including the Flora of North America, treat this taxon as a subspecies of a more broadly-circumscribed Arceuthobium campylopodum, while others, including Plants of the World Online, recognize it as a distinct species.

== Description ==
=== Parasitism ===
Like all dwarf mistletoes, A. microcarpum is a parasite that grows on and draws water and nutrients from a host tree. Both subspecies show strong host preferences: A. microcarpum subsp. microcarpum primarily parasitizes Engelmann spruce (Picea engelmannii) and blue spruce (Picea pungens), and A. microcarpum subsp. aristatae primarily parasitizes Rocky Mountain bristlecone pine trees (Pinus aristata) and less frequently parasitizes Engelmann spruce. Both subspecies also rarely parasitize Corkbark fir (Abies lasiocarpa subsp. arizonica) and southwestern white pine (Pinus strobiformis, sometimes treated as P. reflexa).

=== Morphology ===
Upon germination, a dwarf mistletoe penetrates the bark of its host tree and spends the first few years of its life developing a system of tissues called haustoria that tap into the host's xylem and phloem in order to extract water and nutrients, respectively. After successfully developing this endophytic system, the plant sends out a network of stems that form a shrub sitting on a branch of the host tree. These aerial shoots vary in color from light green, green-brown, blue-green, to purple; stems of A. microcarpum subsp. microcarpum average 6–6.9 cm in length, while A. microcarpum subsp. aristatae has significantly smaller stems averaging 2.7–3.6 cm in length. The stems contain chlorophyll and bear small, scale-like leaves, but their photosynthetic rate is low, and the mistletoe continues to rely on its host for the vast majority of its carbohydrates.

=== Flowers and reproduction ===
Dwarf mistletoes are dioecious, meaning that plants produce either male (staminate) or female (pistillate) flowers. The male flowers have three or four lobes and are 2.5 mm in diameter in subspecies microcarpum and 2 mm in diameter in subspecies aristatae. Flowering occurs from mid July to September, with peak anthesis in late July to early August for subspecies aristatae and in late August to mid-September for subspecies microcarpum. The fruit is a dark green, oblong berry about 2.2 mm wide and 3.5 mm long, noticeably smaller than other dwarf mistletoe fruit. Seed dispersal peaks in September, when hydrostatic pressure in the fruit ejects the seed at an initial velocity of approximately 27 m/s (89 ft/s). A sticky coating called viscin helps the seeds adhere to branches or foliage of potential host trees they strike.

== Ecology ==
=== Effects on host trees ===
All dwarf mistletoes negatively impact the vigor, longevity, and reproductive rate of their hosts, but A. microcarpum infections cause some of the highest mortality rates within the genus. For example, at sites where Picea pungens trees are heavily infected, seedling mortality is twice as high as at uninfected sites. A study in the White Mountains of Arizona found that in stands of severely infected Picea pungens and Picea engelmannii, 20-35% of trees were dead, and half of the dead trees showed signs of the highest level of mistletoe infection. Mortality of infected trees is often compounded by the impact of defoliation by Elatobium abietinum, an invasive species of aphid that feeds on spruce.

Host trees often respond to infection by A. microcarpum by exhibiting abnormal growth patterns, including the formation of witch's brooms. The witch's brooms induced by this mistletoe species are typically small and dense but can be numerous: a heavily infected tree may bear hundreds of brooms. Broom formation reduces seed production by the host plant and is associated with decreased longevity, but it increases available nutrients to the mistletoe.

=== Associations with other organisms ===
Dwarf mistletoes have been identified as a food source for arthropods, birds, and mammals. In particular, Abert's squirrel has been documented feeding on A. microcarpum. The brooms induced by A. microcarpum also provide important microhabitats, serving as nesting sites for birds and small mammals.

In an example of hyperparasitism, at least two species of fungi have been documented parasitizing A. microcarpum, namely Colletotrichum gloeosporioides and Cylindrocarpon gillii. Infection by C. gillii (formerly known as Septogloeum gillii) is characterized by yellowish-white lesions on the stems that enlarge and erupt into masses of white spores, typically killing the mistletoe shoots. Infection by C. gloeosporioides causes black lesions at stem nodes, eventually leading to dieback.

== Distribution ==
A. microcarpum is a high elevation species, occurring in conifer forests at elevations of 2400–3200 meters. Unlike its host species, which extend northward through the Rocky Mountains, A. microcarpum occurs only in Arizona and New Mexico.

A. microcarpum subsp. microcarpum is well-documented in the White Mountains of Arizona, the North Rim of the Grand Canyon, the San Francisco Peaks of Arizona, the Pinaleño Mountains of Arizona, the Mogollon Mountains of New Mexico, and the Sacramento Mountains of New Mexico. The geographic range of A. microcarpum subsp. aristatae is much narrower: it is known only from a few locations in Coconino County, Arizona, including Schultz Mountain in the San Francisco Peaks and Kendrick Peak.

== Conservation ==
Because of its limited range, NatureServe considers A. microcarpum imperiled (T2). However, the species has no state or federal-level protections. Fires, including the Wallow Fire in the White Mountains or Arizona, have eradicated or reduced some populations of A. microcarpum.

== Taxonomy ==
=== History ===
The type specimen of A. microcarpum was collected by Grove Karl Gilbert in 1873, growing on Picea engelmannii in Apache County, Arizona. In 1879, George Engelmann gave the first formal description of the taxon, as A. douglasii var. microcarpum; the specific epithet microcarpum refers to the berries, which are among the smallest of any North American members of the genus. In 1970, Frank Hawksworth and Delbert Wiens recombined the taxon as A. microcarpum, elevating it to the species level.

Jared M. Scott collected the type specimen for A. microcarpum subsp. aristatae in 2006 from near the summit of Schultz Peak in Arizona, where it was growing on Pinus aristata. Together with Robert Mathiasen, Scott formally described A. microcarpum subsp. aristatae in 2009, using morphological features, phenology, and host preference to distinguish it from the nominate subspecies.

=== Modern treatments ===
Taxonomic authorities differ in their treatment of A. microcarpum. Plants of the World Online considerts A. microcarpum a distinct species and recognizes both subspecies microcarpum and aristatae. In contrast, both the Flora of North America and Flora Neomexicana treat the taxon at the subspecific level as A. campylopodum subsp. microcarpum and do not recognize subspecies aristatae at any level.

=== Phylogenetics research ===
A. microcarpum belongs to Section Campylopoda, a clade of dwarf mistletoes in which species boundaries are controversial and difficult to discern. Historically, host affinities have been used to separate mistletoe taxa, but in 1960 Job Kuijt advocated treating the entire section as a single, highly-variable species. This position was supported in 1986 by an electrophoretic study. On the other hand, in 1979, a chemotaxonomic study of the flavonoid compounds found in dwarf mistletoes supported A. microcarpum as a distinct taxon based on its unique flavonoid profile, and the results confirmed the identity of plants in the San Francisco Peaks as A. microcarpum rather than A. cyanocarpum. Similarly, a 2018 morphometric study comparing A. microcarpum to A. campylopodum found evidence supporting the distinction of these two taxa but did not consider other members of Campylopoda.

Phylogenetic studies have been equivocal on whether A. microcarpum represents a distinct species-level taxon. A 1994 molecular phylogeny comparing nuclear ribosomal ITS sequences of dwarf mistletoes found very little genetic differentiation between A. microcarpum, A. abietinum var. magnificae, A. apachecum, and A. campylopodum. A study in 2004 using nuclear ribosomal ITS sequences and chloroplast sequences similarly found little differentiation among twelve of the thirteen members of Campylopoda, leading Daniel Nickrent to recombine A. microcarpum as A. campylopodum subsp. microcarpum. In contrast, a 2021 phylogenetic study found that A. microcarpum forms a monophyletic clade, supporting its treatment as a distinct species.
