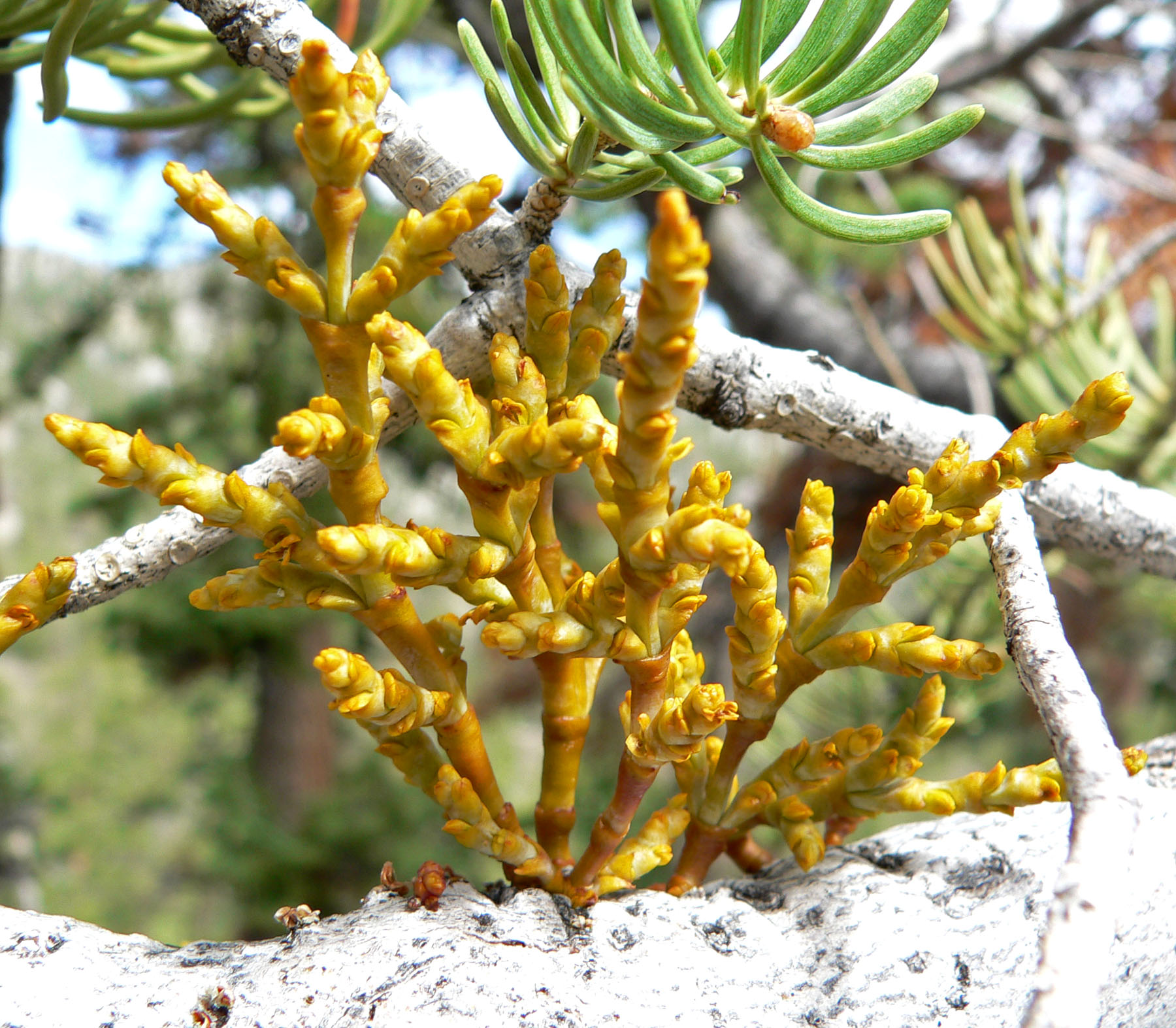

Scientific classification
- Kingdom: Plantae
- Clade: Tracheophytes
- Clade: Angiosperms
- Clade: Eudicots
- Order: Santalales
- Family: Santalaceae
- Genus: Arceuthobium
- Species: A. abietinum

Binomial name
- Arceuthobium abietinum Engelm. ex Munz

Synonyms
- Arceuthobium campylopodum subsp. abietinum (Engelm.) Nickrent

= Arceuthobium abietinum =

Species of dwarf mistletoe

Arceuthobium abietinum, commonly known as fir dwarf mistletoe, is a species of dwarf mistletoe. It is native to western North America from Washington to New Mexico to northern Mexico, where it lives in coniferous forests as a parasite on various species of fir, particularly white fir, giant fir, and red fir, and less commonly on species of pine and spruce. There are four recognized varieties of A. abietinum, largely distinguished by their host preferences and geographic ranges. Largely because of its impacts on host trees, including the production of witch's brooms, A. abietinum significantly impacts forest ecology where it is present.

== Description ==
As with other dwarf mistletoes, A. abietinum is a shrub that grows on and parasitizes conifers. For the first few years of the plant's life, it grows tissues called haustoria within the branches of the host; these tissues tap into the host's xylem and phloem to extract water and nutrients, respectively. After accumulating resources for a period of two to five years, the mistletoe grows a network of stems that emerge from the host tree, forming a small shrub. The stems have a fan-shaped branching pattern and average 12 cm in length but range from 3.5 cm to 24.5 cm. While the aerial shoots contain chlorophyll and bear small, scale-shaped leaves, their photosynthetic rate is low, and the mistletoe continues to rely on its host for the vast majority of its carbohydrates.

Plants of A. abietinum are dioecious, with male and female mistletoe plants producing spikes of staminate and pistillate flowers, respectively. Male flowers have 3 or 4 petals, average 3 mm in diameter, and bloom in mid- to late summer, usually peaking in August.

Flowers of Arceuthobium abietinum var. mathiasenii
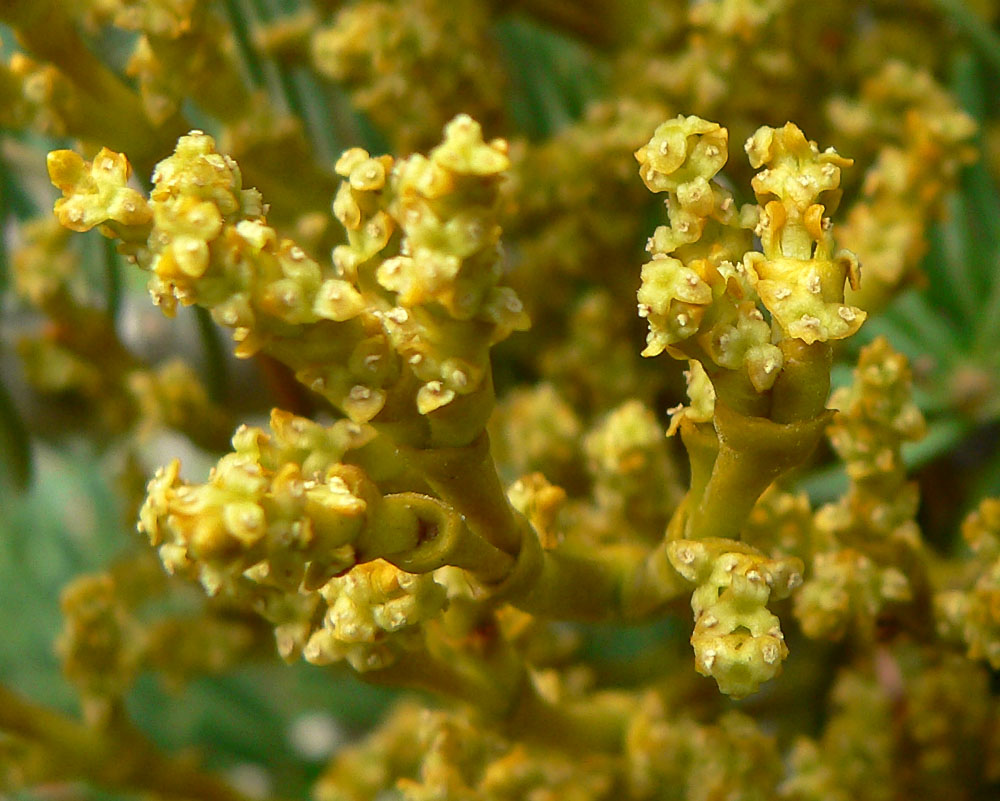
male flowers in full bloom

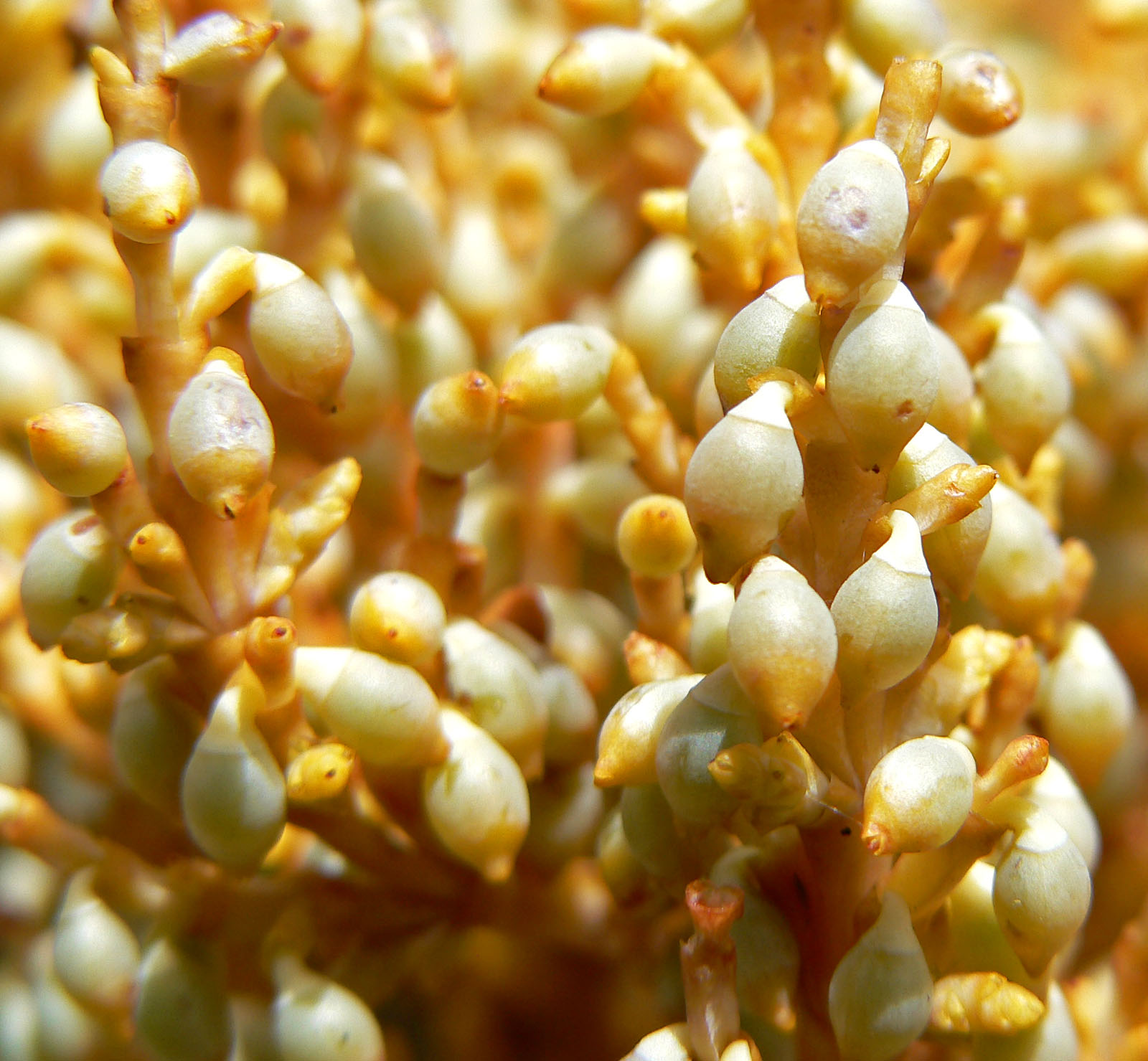
female flowers at the tips of the fruit

Fruit are sticky, oblong berries, 4–5 mm long, green, and glaucous. Seed dispersal peaks in late summer to early autumn, when hydrostatic pressure in the fruit propels the seed at an initial velocity of 27 m/s (89 ft/s). The average dispersal distances for A. abietinum ranges from 9.2 meters to 10.7 meters, depending on the variety. A sticky coating of viscin on the seed helps it attach to its host.

== Ecology ==
Infection by A. abietinum negatively affects the growth and health of host trees, reducing longevity and seed production. A. abietinum also regularly induces abnormal growth patterns in its host, including the production of witch's brooms. While these brooms are typically small, flattened, and nonsystematic, A. abietinum var. wiensii often induces large brooms in Picea breweriana. These brooms increase the availability of nutrients to the mistletoe and provide valuable habitat for wildlife, but they also decrease the vigor of the host tree. Unlike in some other mistletoe-conifer relationships, the brooms that A. abietinum induces in its hosts do not significantly increase the host's susceptibility to fire.

On true firs infected by dwarf mistletoes, further infection by the canker fungus Cytospora abietis is common, resulting in flagging and death of infected branches.

Plants of A. abietinum serve as a food source for squirrels and hairstreak butterflies in the genus Callophrys, including the thicket hairstreak and possibly Johnson's hairstreak. Because hairstreak larvae take on the color of their food and have a knobby texture, they are camouflaged on mistletoe shoots while feeding. The spittlebug Clastoptera distincta, a specialist on dwarf mistletoes, has also been found feeding on A. abietinum in Arizona.

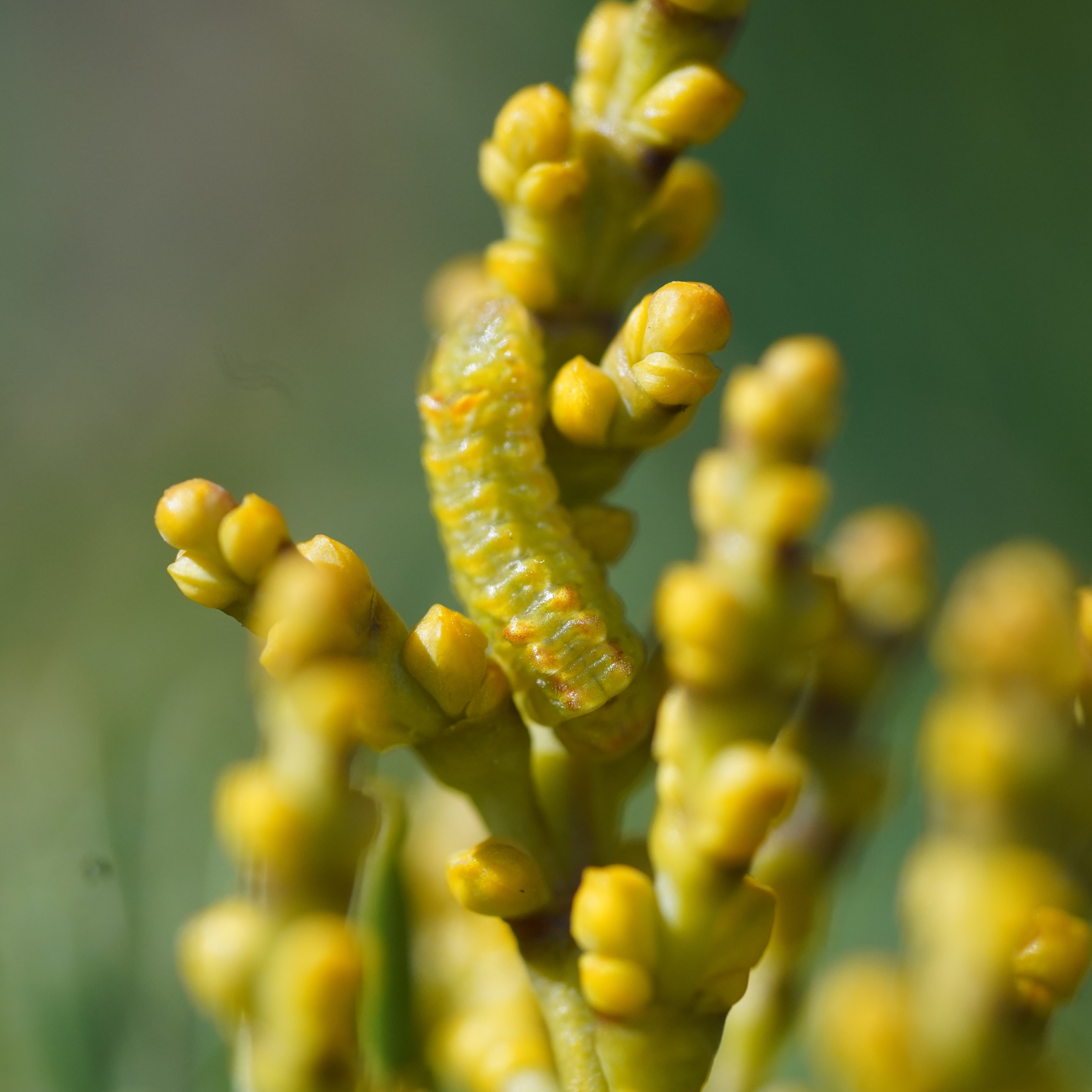
larva of a hairstreak butterfly feeding on Arceuthobium abietinum var. grandae shoots

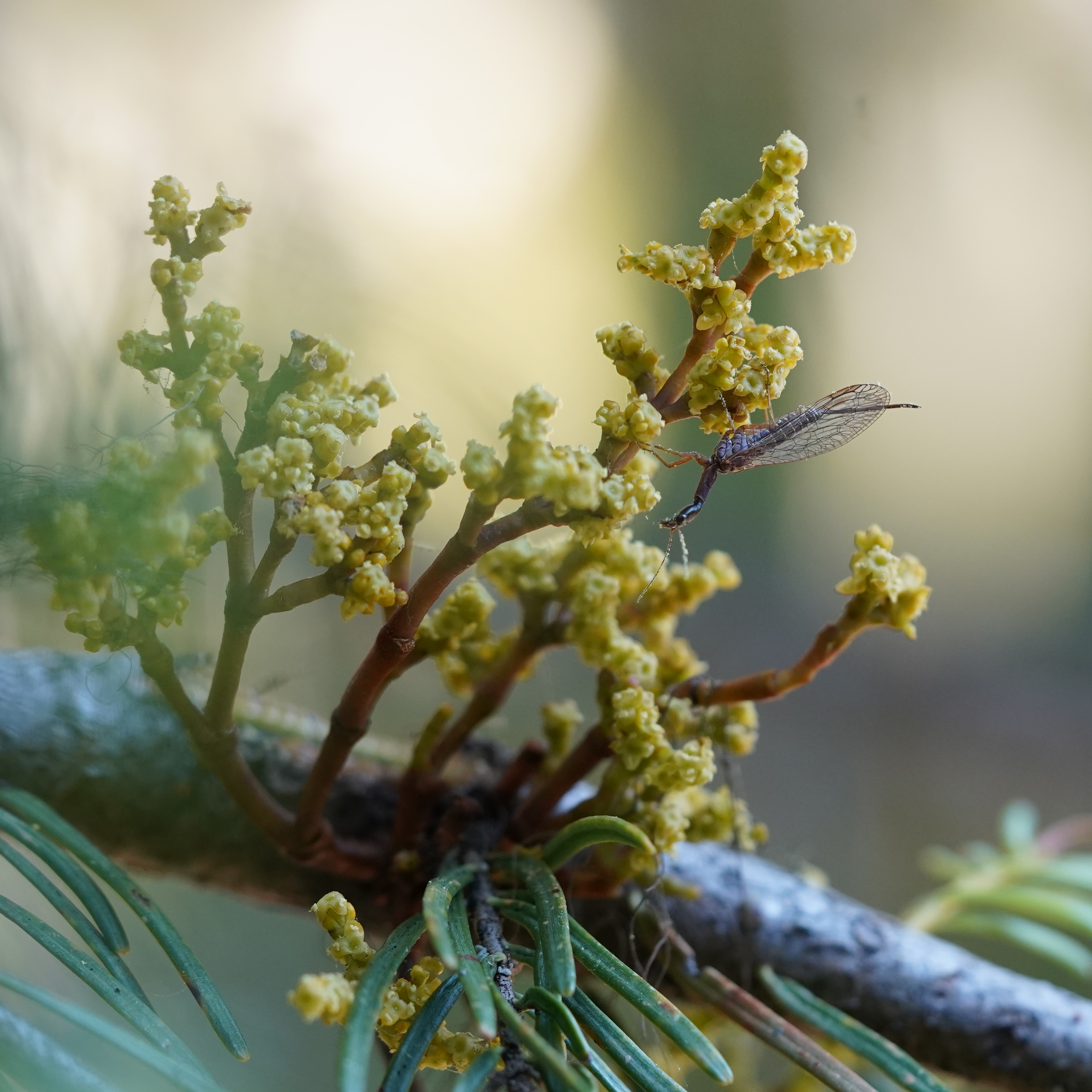
a snakefly (Agulla) feeding on pollen of male Arceuthobium abietinum var. grandae flowers

== Taxonomy ==
=== Treatments of Arceuthobium abietinum within Section Campylopoda ===
A. abietinum belongs to a clade of dwarf mistletoes called Section Campylopoda, in which species boundaries are difficult to identify. In 1960, Job Kuijt advocated lumping all members of Campylopoda into a single, highly-variable species. On the other hand, morphological several characters and host affinities have been used to separate A. abietinum from other species in Campylopoda, for example by Robert Mathiasen and Shawn Kenaley. Phylogenetic work on Campylopoda from 2012 comparing nuclear ribosomal ITS and chloroplast sequences found little genetic differentiation between putative taxa in Campylopoda, leading Daniel Nickrent to propose treating A. abietinum as a subspecies of a more broadly-circumscribed A. campylopodum.

Owing to the lack of consensus about the taxonomy of Campylopoda, authorities disagree in their treatments of A. abietinum. Some regional taxonomic authorities such as the Burke Herbarium, Oregon Flora Project, and Flora of the Pacific Northwest recognize A. abietinum as a species, as does Plants of the World Online. The Flora of North America treats A. abietinum at the subspecific level as A. campylopodum subsp. abietinum and does not recognize the varieties. In contrast,The Jepson Manual synonymizes A. abietinum and all other members of Campylopoda with A. campylopodum.

Among authorities that recognize A. abietinum as a species, treatments of the infraspecific taxonomy also differ. For example, POWO recognizes infraspecific taxa at the varietal level, following work of Tiehm, whereas OFP recognizes infraspecific taxa at the subspecies level.

=== Recognized varieties ===
Since dwarf mistletoes in Section Campylopoda are morphologically similar and often sympatric, host preference is important for identification. The five varieties of A. abietinum are distinguished largely by the following preferences.

- Arceuthobium abietinum var. abietinum, commonly known as white fir dwarf mistletoe, principally infects the Sierra white fir (Abies concolor subsp. lowiana). In areas where infection rates are high, rare cross-infection to other conifers is possible, including to subalpine fir (Abies lasiocarpa), Sierra lodgepole pine (Pinus contorta subsp. murrayana), sugar pine (Pinus lambertiana), and western white pine (Pinus monticola). Plants of this variety are yellow or yellow-green.
- Arceuthobium abietinum var. grandae (Kenaley) Tiehm, commonly known as grand fir dwarf mistletoe, principally infects the grand fir (Abies grandis) and the grandicolor fir (Abies grandis × colcolor). Rare cross-infection is also possible, to Pacific silver fir (Abies amabilis), Engelmann spruce (Picea engelmannii), and sugar pine (Pinus lambertiana). Plants of this variety are yellow or yellow-green.
- Arceuthobium abietinum var. magnificae (Mathiasen & Kenaley) Tiehm, commonly known as red fir dwarf mistletoe infects the red fir (Abies magnifica) and is not documented on other host species. Plants of this variety are yellow-green to greenish-brown.
- Arceuthobium abietinum var. mathiasenii (Kenaley) Tiehm, commonly known as Mathiasen's dwarf mistletoe, principally infects the Rocky mountain white fir (Abies concolor subsp. concolor) and Durango fir (Abies durangensis). It sometimes cross-infects Mexican spruce (Picea engelmannii subsp. mexicana) and, rarely, Southwestern white pine (Pinus strobiformis). Plants of this variety are yellow-green to blue-green and highly glaucous.
- Arceuthobium abietinum var. wiensii (Mathiasen & C.M. Daugherty) Tiehm, commonly known as Wiens' dwarf mistletoe, principally infects the red white fir (Abies magnifica) and Brewer's spruce (Picea breweriana). Occasionally, it cross-infects grandicolor fir (Abies grandis × colcolor) and Western white pine (Pinus monticola). Plants of this variety differ from other varieties of A. abietinum in color, being distinctively reddish-brown or brownish-green.

=== Type specimens ===
The type specimen for A. abietinum was collected by J. G. Lemmon in 1875, growing on Abies concolor subsp. lowiana in the Sierra Valley. It was formally described by George Engelmann in 1880 as Arceuthobium douglasii var. abietinum before being recombined as A. abietinum by Munz in 1935.

The type specimen for the nominate variety (i.e. A. abietinum var. abietinum) is the same as the type specimen for the species. Types for the other varieties are listed below.

- The type specimen for A. abietinum var. grandae was collected by R.L. Mathiasen in 2019, growing on Abies grandis in Deschutes County, Oregon. It was formally described in 2020 by Shawn Kenaley as A. abietinum subsp. grandae and later recombined as A. abietinum var. grandae by Arnold Tiehm.
- The type specimen for A. abietinum var. magnificae was collected by Mathiasen and C.M. Daugherty in 2018, growing on Abies magnifica on Echo Summit in El Dorado County, California. It was formally described in 2019 by Mathiasen and Kenaley as A. abietinum subsp. magnificae before being recombined as A. abietinum var. magnificae by Tiehm.
- The type specimen for A. abietinum var. mathiasenii was collected by Mathiasen in 2019, growing on Abies concolor subsp. concolor on the Pink Cliffs of Dixie National Forest in Kane County, Utah. It was formally described in 2020 by Kenaley as A. abietinum subsp. mathiasenii and later recombined as A. abietinum var. mathiasenii by Arnold Tiehm.
- The type specimen for A. abietinum subsp. wiensii was collected by Mathiasen and Daugherty in 2008, growing on Picea breweriana on Baldy Mountain in Siskiyou County, California. It was formally described in 2009 as A. abietinum subsp. wiensii before being recombined as A. abietinum var. wiensii by Tiehm.

== Distribution ==
A. abietinum has a wide distribution compared to most other dwarf mistletoes, occurring across much of western North America in Washington, Oregon, California, Nevada, Arizona, and Utah. The geographic ranges of its varieties are described below.

- Arceuthobium abietinum var. abietinum: Distribution is limited to California, from the southern Cascade Range through the Sierra Nevada with a disjunct population in the San Bernardino Mountains.
- Arceuthobium abietinum var. grandae: Distribution ranges from southern Washington, through the Cascade Range, and throughout the Siskiyou Mountains and Klamath Mountains of Southern Oregon and Northern California.
- Arceuthobium abietinum var. magnificae: Distribution is limited to California, throughout the Sierra Nevada.
- Arceuthobium abietinum var. mathiasenii: This variety has the southernmost distribution, occurring in southern Nevada, southern Utah, Arizona, and Northern Mexico. Though the distribution of this variety is fairly broad, it consists of a system of isolated populations.
- Arceuthobium abietinum var. wiensii: The distribution of this variety is limited to the Klamath-Siskiyou region in southwestern Oregon and Northwestern California, which has been identified as an epicenter of dwarf mistletoe biodiversity. Populations of this mistletoe are isolated rather than continuously distributed.

== Conservation status ==
NatureServe lists A. abietinum var. mathiasenii as imperiled in Nevada and critically imperiled in Utah. Though the conservation status of A. abietinum var. wiensii has not been assessed, it is one of the rarest and most poorly-documented mistletoe taxa in North America.
