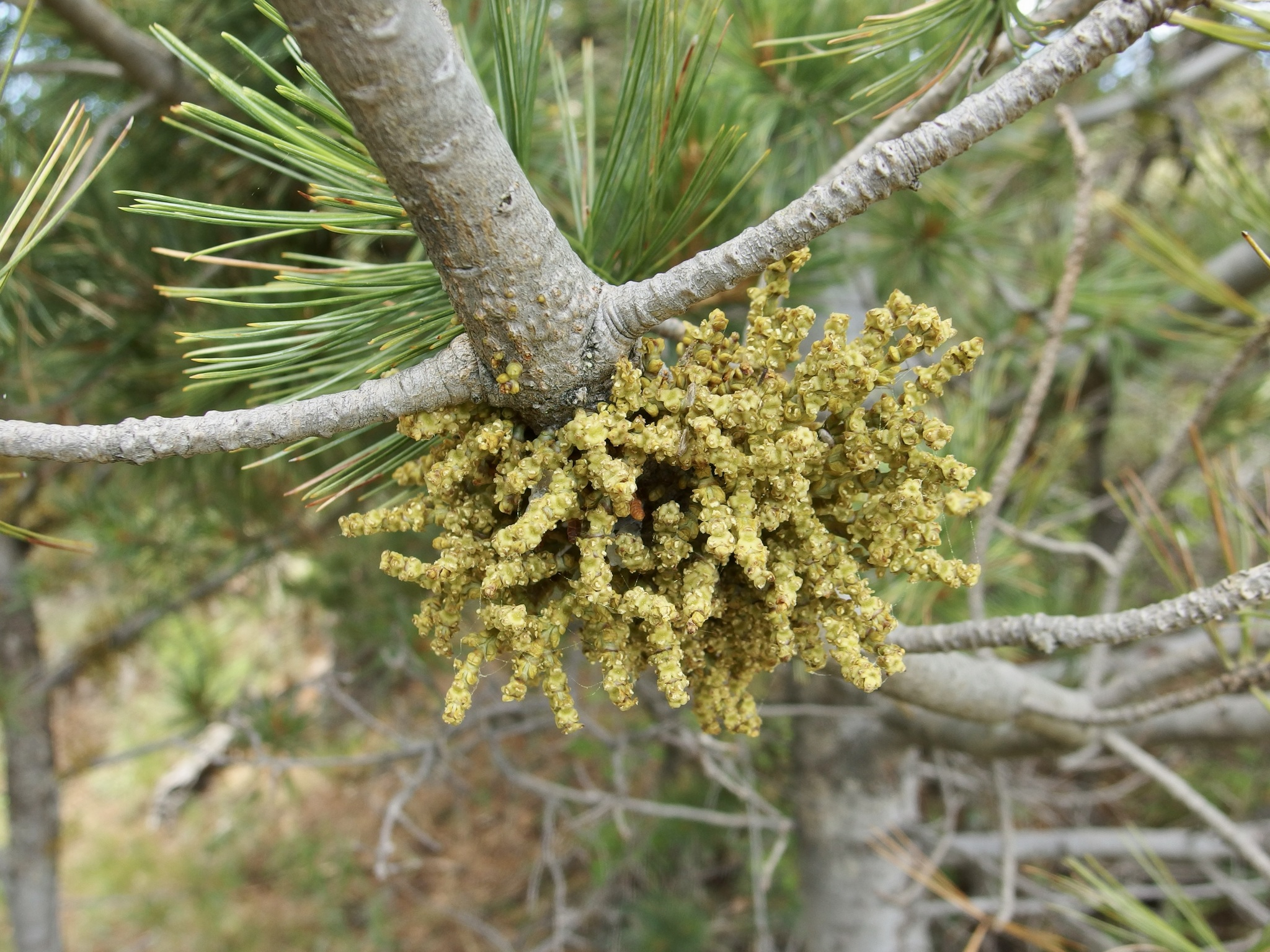

Scientific classification
- Kingdom: Plantae
- Clade: Embryophytes
- Clade: Tracheophytes
- Clade: Angiosperms
- Clade: Eudicots
- Order: Santalales
- Family: Santalaceae
- Genus: Arceuthobium
- Species: A. apachecum

Binomial name
- Arceuthobium apachecum Hawksw. & Wiens

Synonyms
- Arceuthobium campylopodum subsp. apachecum (Hawksw. & Wiens) Nickr.

= Arceuthobium apachecum =

Species of dwarf mistletoe

Arceuthobium apachecum, commonly known as Apache dwarf mistletoe and as Arceuthobium campylopodum subsp. apachecum, is a species of dwarf mistletoe. It is a parasitic plant that grows as a shrub on the branches and trunks of Southwestern white pine (Pinus strobiformis, sometimes treated as Pinus reflexa) trees in Arizona, New Mexico and Coahuila. In turn, it is often parasitized by species of fungi. Like with many dwarf mistletoe species, populations of A. apachecum impact the ecology of their environments significantly, degrading the health of host trees but providing food and creating habitat for various animals.

== Description ==
All species of dwarf mistletoe gain most of their nutrients and all of their water by parasitizing a host tree. Most of the plant consists of tissues called haustoria which grow inside the host tree, tapping into its xylem and phloem. After developing this endophytic system over the first few years of its life, A. apachecum grows a network of densely-clustered, yellowish, flabellately-branched stems 3-4 cm (or rarely up to 10 cm) long that emerge from the host. As with other dwarf mistletoes, the leaves of A. apachecum are minute and reduced to scales that clasp the stem.

Plants of A. apachecum are dioecious, meaning that each individual produces either staminate (male) or pistillate (female) flowers. Male flowers have 3 or 4 petals, are 2.5-3 mm in diameter, and bloom late July to mid-September, with peak anthesis in early September. The fruit is a green, ovoid berry with a slightly glaucous surface, 4 mm long, maturing in late summer to early fall, with peak seed dispersal in September. As with other species of mistletoe, hydrostatic pressure pressure builds up in the fruit until it discharges its seed at a velocity of up to 60 miles per hour. The seed is covered in a sticky substance called viscin which helps it adhere to its target; only seeds that land on young branches of Southwestern white pines can successfully germinate.

Notably, A. apachecum has exclusively been documented parasitizing Southwestern white pine, with no reported cross infections on other hosts. Taxonomic authorities differ in their treatment of this species of pine, which is called Pinus strobiformis or sometimes (in Arizona, New Mexico, and extreme northern Mexico, including the entire range of A. apachecum) Pinus reflexa. Another species of dwarf mistletoe, Blumer's dwarf mistletoe (A. blumeri), also parasitizes southwestern white pines, but it differs from A. apachecum by its larger size and wider range of colors. These two species can also be differentiated by their range, which does not overlap.

== Distribution ==
The geographic distribution of A. apachecum is narrow compared to other species in its genus. In the United States, it ranges from southeastern Arizona to southwestern and central New Mexico, primarily at high elevations from 2000 to 3000 meters. In Arizona, populations have been documented in the White Mountains, Pinaleño Mountains, Santa Catalina Mountains, Chiricahua Mountains, and Santa Rita Mountains, and in New Mexico, populations have been documented in the Mogollon Mountains, Mangas mountains, Magdalena Mountains, San Mateo Mountains, and Capitan Mountains. A disjunct population also exists in northern Mexico, in the Sierra del Carmen.

Because populations of A. apachecum are scattered across several mountain ranges, the distribution of this species is particularly susceptible to influence by large wildfires, including the Wallow Fire in the White Mountains of Arizona.

== Ecology ==
Infection by A. apachecum reduces the longevity and fecundity of Southwestern white pines, and heavily infected trees show mortality rates more than 30 times higher than uninfected trees. As with many dwarf mistletoes, A. apachecum sometimes induces abnormal growth, including witch's brooms, on its hosts. The brooms induced by A. apachecum are typically spherical and not systemic throughout the host. Broom formation caused by A. apachecum reportedly occurs more frequently at higher elevations. The formation of brooms is detrimental to the health of the host tree but also provide important habitat for small mammals and birds.

Associations between A. apachecum and animals are poorly understood, although they are likely insect pollinated, as are many members of the genus. Dwarf mistletoes in general are known to be an important food source for larvae of some butterflies, including species of hairstreaks.

In an example of hyperparasitism, two species of fungi have been documented infecting A. apachecum: Colletotrichum gloeosporioides and Cylindrocarpon gillii. Neither fungus is obligate on A. apachecum, although the latter species only parasitizes dwarf mistletoes. Infection by C. gloeosporioides is characterized by small black lesions on the shoots and fruits of mistletoe plants, eventually causing dieback. Infection by C. gillii is characterized by yellowish-white lesions on mistletoe shoots, erupting in white masses of spores. Both species act as natural biocontrol agents of dwarf mistletoes.

== Conservation ==
A. apachecum is listed as a vulnerable species globally and in the United States. In 1975, it was listed under the Endangered Species Act of 1973, although it was later delisted owing to a better understanding of its rarity. NatureServe lists this species as imperiled in Arizona, largely due to threats to Southwestern white pine by white pine blister rust, large wildfires, and severe drought.

== Taxonomy ==
Frank Hawksworth, Paul Lightle, and Robert Gilbertson collected the type specimen of A. apachecum in 1968, near the summit of Mount Lemmon in Pima County, Arizona. The species epithet apachecum refers to the narrow geographic range of this species, which is largely limited to the Apache homelands.

Species boundaries in Section Campylpoda, clade containing A. apachecum, are difficult to identify, and taxonomic treatments vary among authorities. Plants of the World Online recognizes A. apachecum at the species level, following the framework advocated by Mathiasen and Kenaley. Some authorities, including the Flora of North America, treat this taxon as A. campylopodum subsp. apachecum, following a framework advocated by Nickrent.

Because both A. apachecum and A. blumeri occur in southern Arizona and northern Mexico and specialize on Southwestern white pine, botanists have questioned the distinction between the two species. Cross-pollination studies failed to produce viable hybrid fruit, but the studies were inconclusive because control groups also yielded few viable fruit. Chemotaxonomic studies also demonstrated differences between A. apachecum and other species, including A. blumeri. Later, a phylogenetic analysis of Section Campylopoda utilizing nuclear ribosomal ITS sequences and chloroplast sequences supported A. blumeri as a well-defined genetic lineage forming a basal clade in the section distinct from A. apachecum.
