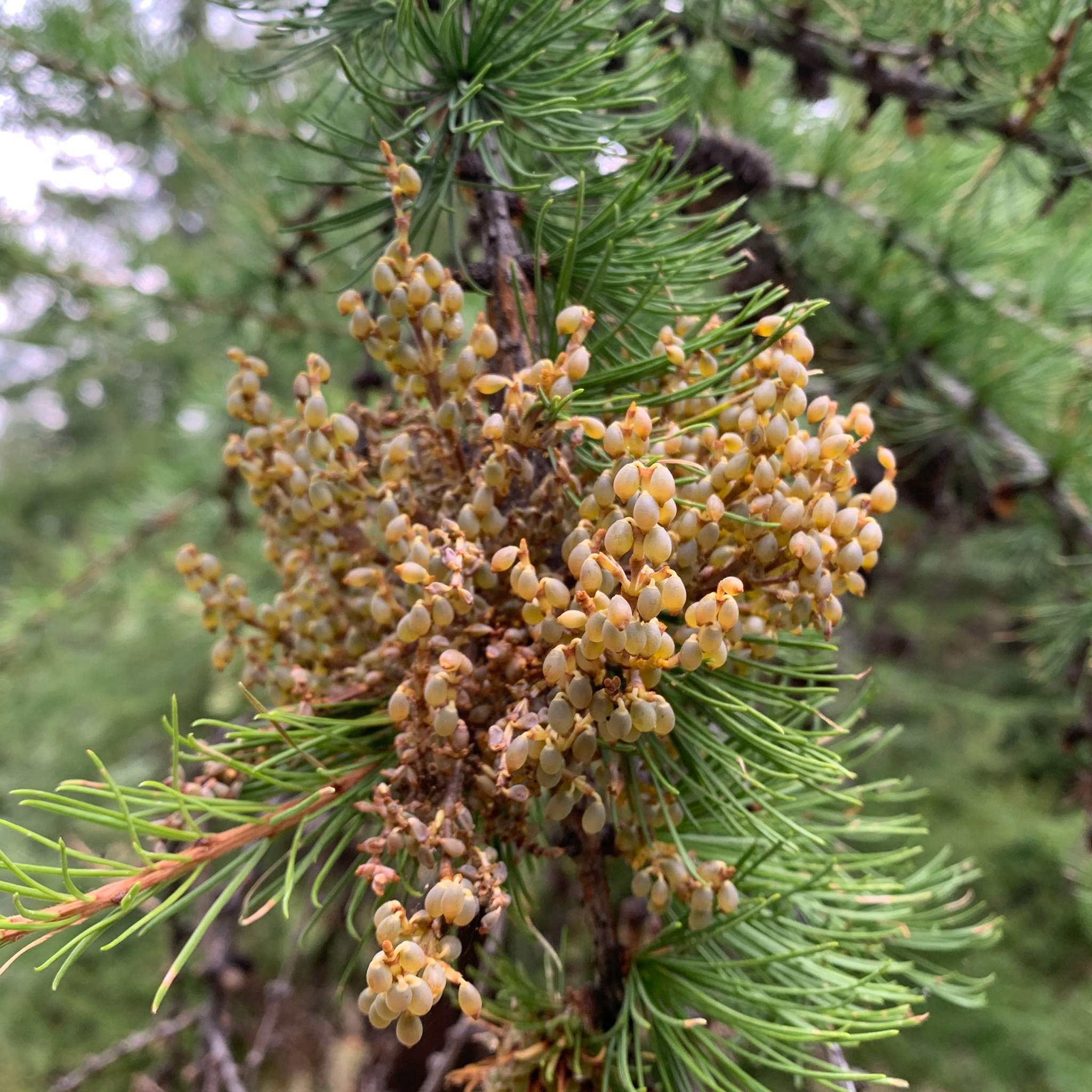

Conservation status
- Apparently Secure (NatureServe)

Scientific classification
- Kingdom: Plantae
- Clade: Tracheophytes
- Clade: Angiosperms
- Clade: Eudicots
- Order: Santalales
- Family: Santalaceae
- Genus: Arceuthobium
- Species: A. laricis

Binomial name
- Arceuthobium laricis (Piper) H.St.John

Synonyms
- Arceuthobium douglasii var. laricis M.E.Jones; Arceuthobium campylopodum subsp. laricis (M.E.Jones) Nickrent; Razoumofskya laricis Piper

= Arceuthobium laricis =

Species of flowering plant

Arceuthobium laricis, commonly known as larch dwarf mistletoe, is a species of flowering plant in the family Santalaceae. As with other species of dwarf mistletoe, A. laricis parasitizes several species of conifers, especially the western larch and mountain hemlock. Its geographic range largely coincides with the range of the western larch through the Pacific Northwest.

A. laricis significantly impacts the ecology of conifer forests where it occurs. Mistletoe infections decrease the vitality and reproductive rate of host trees, often leading to tree death. They induce the formation of witch's brooms on host trees, which serve as important microhabitats for wildlife and increase available fuel for wildfires. The species is also an important food source for birds and insects and is itself parasitized by two species of fungi.

Since its formal description by Charles Piper, taxonomists have placed A. laricis under several names. Its taxonomy is still debated, with some authorities treating it as a subspecies of Arceuthobium campylopodum and others maintaining it as a distinct species.

== Description ==
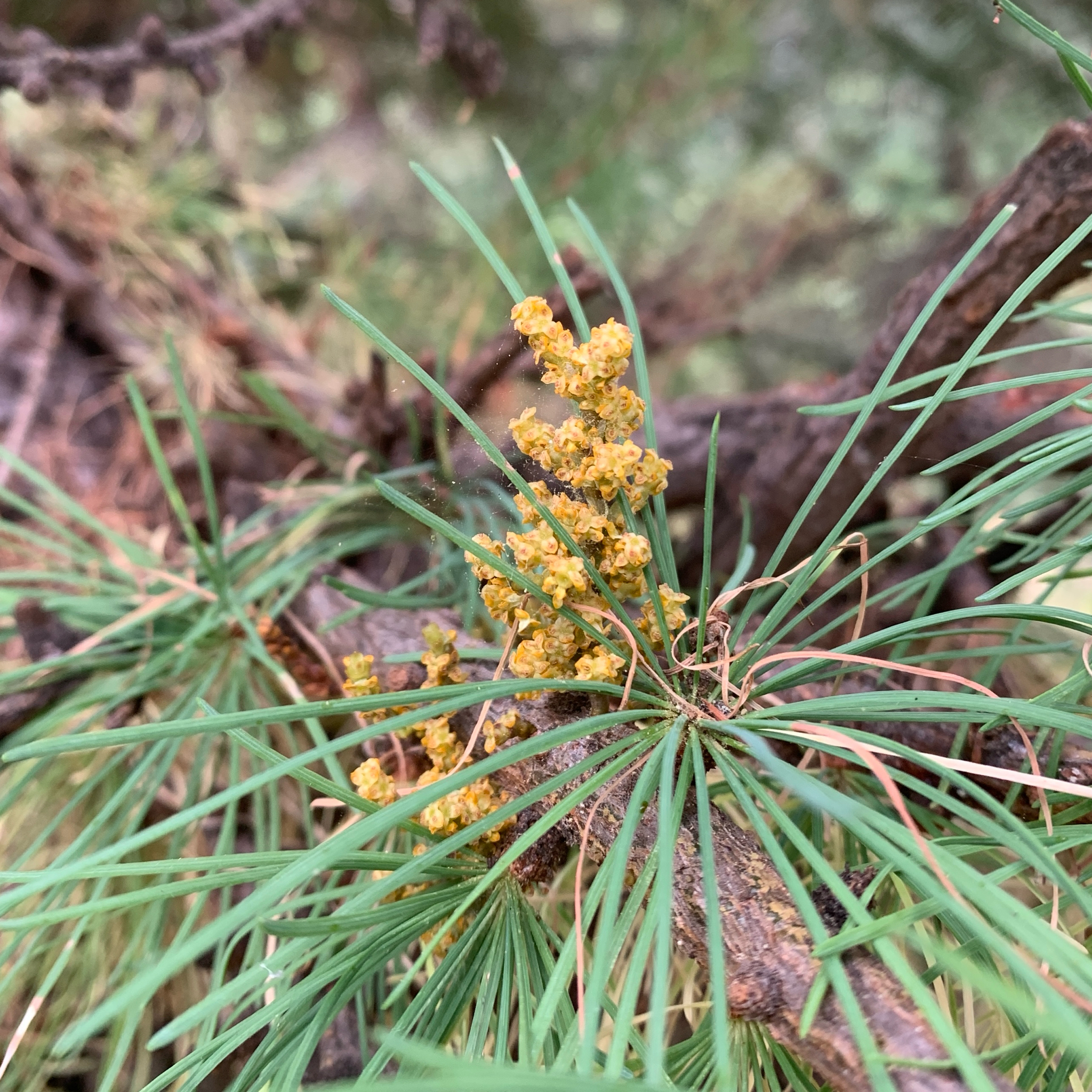
a male (staminate) plant in bloom, growing on Larix occidentalis in the Wallowa Mountains

=== Parasitism ===
A. laricis is a shrub that grows on and parasitizes conifers in order to obtain water and most of its nutrients. Its principal hosts are the western larch (Larix occidentalis) and mountain hemlock (Tsuga mertensiana), although it infects a remarkably large range of hosts, including interior lodgepole pine (Pinus contorta var. latifolia), subalpine fir (Abies lasiocarpa), and ponderosa pine (Pinus ponderosa var. ponderosa) and rarely grand fir (Abies grandis), Engelmann spruce (Picea engelmannii), whitebark pine (Pinus albicaulis), and western white pine (Pinus monticola). Host affinity can be an important identifying feature of A. laricis, which is the only species of mistletoe that primarily parasitizes Larix occidentalis and one of only two species with Tsuga mertensiana as a primary host (the other being Arceuthobium tsugense subsp. mertensianae).

An inoculation experiment demonstrated that A. laricis is capable of infecting non-native larches, including European larch (Larix decidua) and Japanese larch (Larix kaempferi). However, it has not been documented growing outside its native range.

=== Morphology ===
Upon germinating on a young branch of a host tree, A. laricis penetrates the bark of its host and develops a system of tissues called haustoria that tap into the host's xylem and phloem in order to extract water and nutrients, respectively. After a few years developing this endophytic system within the host, the mistletoe produces a network of flabellately-branched stems that emerge from the bark of the host near the initial infection site. These stems are yellow-green, brown-green, purplish or red, sometimes with bands of different colors on the same plant. The plants range in height from 2–10 cm (0.8–3.9 in), with an average of 5 cm (2.0 in). Although the aerial stems and small, scale-like leaves of A. laricis contain chlorophyll, their photosynthetic rate is low, and the mistletoe continues to rely on its host for the vast majority of its carbohydrates.

=== Flowers and reproduction ===
Like other species of dwarf mistletoe, A. laricis is dioecious, meaning that plants produce either male (staminate) or female (pistillate) flowers. Male flowers have three or four lobes and average 2.7–3.7 mm (0.11–0.15 in) in diameter. Flowering occurs for a period of about six weeks, ranging from mid-July to mid-September depending on the year. The fruit is an oblong berry, averaging 4.3 mm (0.17 in) in length and 3 mm (0.12 in) in width, maturing from late August to early October. Once sufficient hydrostatic pressure builds up inside the fruit, the seed is ejected at an initial velocity of approximately 27 m/s (89 ft/s), with dispersal distance averaging 6.1 m (20 ft) and up to 15.3 m (50 ft). A sticky coating called viscin helps the seeds adhere to branches or foliage of potential host trees they strike. However, only a small proportion of seeds that germinate successfully infect their host: experimental inoculations of the primary host Larix occidentalis resulted in 2% of A. laricis producing shoots.

== Ecology ==
=== Effects on host trees ===
Infection by A. laricis negatively impacts the host tree, resulting in reduced vigor, lower seed production, and early mortality. For example, Larix occidentalis infected by A. laricis tend to have less sapwood, and large, heavily infected trees exhibit higher water use than uninfected trees. In fir, larch, and hemlocks, fungal pathogens can enter the host tree through the point where A. laricis penetrates the bark, further compounding the detrimental effects of infection.

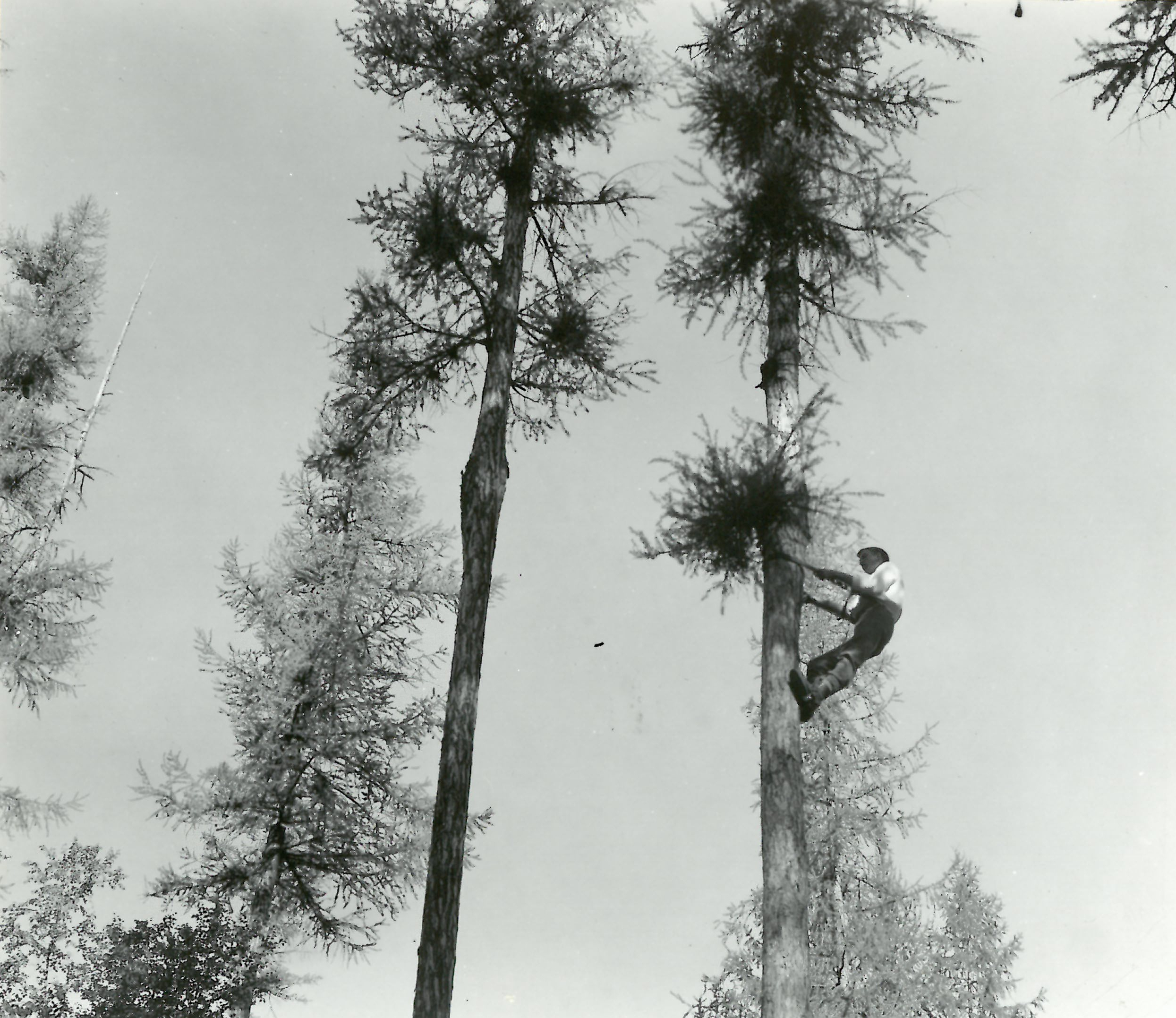
Two western larch trees in Montana with significant swelling and broom formation from infection by A. laricis

A. laricis regularly induces abnormal growth in its host, including swelling and the formation of witch's brooms. Brooms act as a resource sink, funneling water and nutrients toward the point of infection for use by the mistletoe. The large, often dense brooms that A. laricis induces on Larix occidentalis easily break off the host tree, especially under the weight of snow, and provide fuel for wildfires. Since L. occidentalis is a fire-adapted species, some ecologists have suggested that the increase in wildfire frequency associated to broom formation can benefit populations of L. occidentalis by clearing out fire-sensitive competitors.

=== Associations with other organisms ===
A. laricis is ecologically significant to wildlife. The larvae of the thicket hairstreak butterfly (Callophrys spinetorum) feed only on dwarf mistletoes, including A. laricis. Blue grouse (genus Dendragapus) have been documented eating A. laricis while feeding on the host trees. Moreover, the witch's brooms induced by dwarf mistletoes often serve as nesting habitats for birds and small mammals. Red-breasted nuthatches in particular tend to nest in areas with higher A. laricis density, possibly because the increased host mortality yields higher availability of nesting cavities.

In an example of hyperparasitism, two species of fungi have been documented parasitizing A. laricis: Colletotrichum gloeosporioides and Cylindrocarpon gillii. Infection by C. gillii (formerly Septogloeum gillii) is characterized by yellowish-white lesions on the stems that enlarge and erupt into masses of white spores, typically killing the mistletoe shoots. C. gloeosporioides causes black lesions at stem nodes and dieback of the infected shoots.

== Distribution ==
A. laricis has a broad range through the Pacific Northwest, largely coinciding with the range of Larix occidentalis, through Oregon, Washington, British Columbia, Idaho, and Montana. Its elevational range is 600–2300 m. This species is especially common on larch in northeastern Oregon and the Idaho panhandle. While considered "apparently secure" by NatureServeover its whole range, it is listed as vulnerable in British Columbia.

Several disjunct populations exist in areas where Larix occidentalis does not grow but where the mistletoe instead infects Tsuga mertensiana, all of which are in Washington. These populations are found near Wakepish Creek on the east side of Mount St. Helens, in the Alpental ski area in King County, near Sloan Creek in Snohomish County, in Heather Meadows in Whatcom County, and to the south of Mount Olympus.

== Taxonomy ==
=== History ===
Louis Henderson collected the type specimen for A. laricis near Mount Adams in Washington, where it was growing on Larix occidentalis. Charles Piper formally described the species in 1906 as Razoumofskya douglasii subsp. laricis. In 1910, Marcus E. Jones recombined the taxon as A. douglasii var. laricis but referenced a different type specimen, collected in the Mission Mountains of Montana. Later, in 1914, Piper elevated the taxon to the species level as Razoumofskya laricis. After Razoumofskya was synonymized with Arceuthobium, Harold St. John recombined the species as Arceuthobium laricis in 1937. Based on phylogenetic studies, Daniel L. Nickrent recombined the taxon as A. campylopodum subsp. laricis in 2012, but other authors, including Shawn Kenaley and Robert L. Mathiasen, have continued advocating for recognition of A. laricis at the species level.

=== Modern treatments ===
Contemporary taxonomic authorities differ in their treatment of A. laricis. The global database Plants of the World Online considers A. laricis a species, as do several regional floras, including The Oregon Flora Project, the Burke Herbarium, the Flora of British Columbia, and the Flora of the Pacific Northwest. In contrast, the Flora of North America treats this taxon at the subspecies level as A. campylopodum subsp. laricis, applying a broader circumscription of A. campylopodum.

=== Phylogenetic research ===
Within the genus Arceuthobium, A. laricis belongs to a taxonomically difficult clade called Section Campylopoda, in which species boundaries are difficult to discern. Traditionally, taxa have been classified according to their host affinities, but in 1960 Job Kuijt lumped all members of Campylopoda into A. campylopodum, which he regarded as a single, highly-variable species. An electrophoretic study in 1986 found little genetic differentiation between members of Campylopoda, supporting Kuijt's interpretation. A 1979 chemotaxonomic study did find that some taxa in Campylopoda were distinguished by their flavonoid compound profiles but did not address the results for A. laricis explicitly. Mathiasen and Kenaley in 2015 applied a multivariate statistical analysis of morphological features to advocate treating A. laricis as a species distinct from either A. campylopodum or the closely-related A. tsugense.

Phylogenetic studies have produced mixed interpretations of the taxonomy of Campylopoda, although no molecular evidence supports the recognition of A. laricis at the species level. A study in 2004 comparing nuclear ribosomal ITS sequences and chloroplast sequences found that among twelve of the thirteen members of Campylopoda, the level of genetic differentiation was low enough to support treating members of Campylopoda as subspecies of A. campylopodum. In contrast, a 2021 phylogenetic study identified some monophyletic groups in Campylopoda, supporting continued recognition of at least some taxa in Campylopoda at the species level. However, the samples of A. laricis fell into different clades, with one sample (collected from Picea engelmannii) in a strongly-supported clade with samples of A. tsugense (excluding subsp. mertensianae) and another in a clade with A. campylopodum and A. occidentale.
