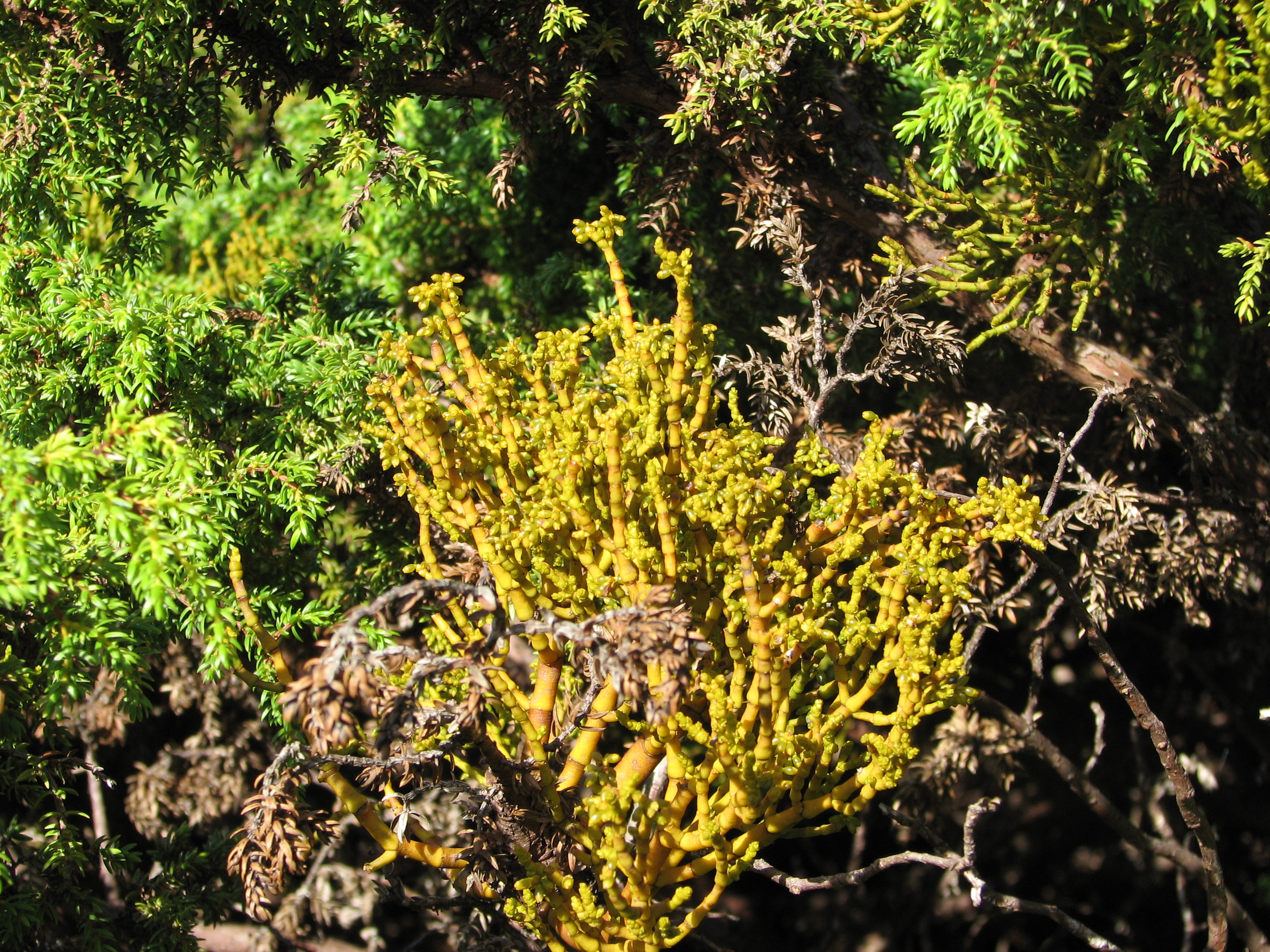
- Flowering Arceuthobium azoricum attached to the branch of an Azores juniper

Scientific classification
- Kingdom: Plantae
- Clade: Embryophytes
- Clade: Tracheophytes
- Clade: Spermatophytes
- Clade: Angiosperms
- Clade: Eudicots
- Order: Santalales
- Family: Santalaceae
- Genus: Arceuthobium
- Species: A. azoricum

Binomial name
- Arceuthobium azoricum Wiens & Hawksw.

= Arceuthobium azoricum =

Species of dwarf mistletoe

Arceuthobium azoricum (Portuguese: espigos-de-cedro) is a species of dwarf mistletoe endemic to the Azores. The population is restricted to the Grupo Central (central group) of the archipelago on Faial, Pico, São Jorge and Terceira islands. It is a parasitic plant of the local Juniperus brevifolia.
