= Frankliniella hawksworthi =

Scientific classification
- Kingdom: Animalia
- Phylum: Arthropoda
- Class: Insecta
- Order: Thysanoptera
- Family: Thripidae
- Genus: Frankliniella
- Species: F. hawksworthi

Binomial name
- Frankliniella hawksworthi O'Neill, 1970

Species of insect

Frankliniella hawksworthi is a species of thrips associated exclusively with Arceuthobium, dwarf mistletoes. The species was named after Frank Goode Hawksworth.
