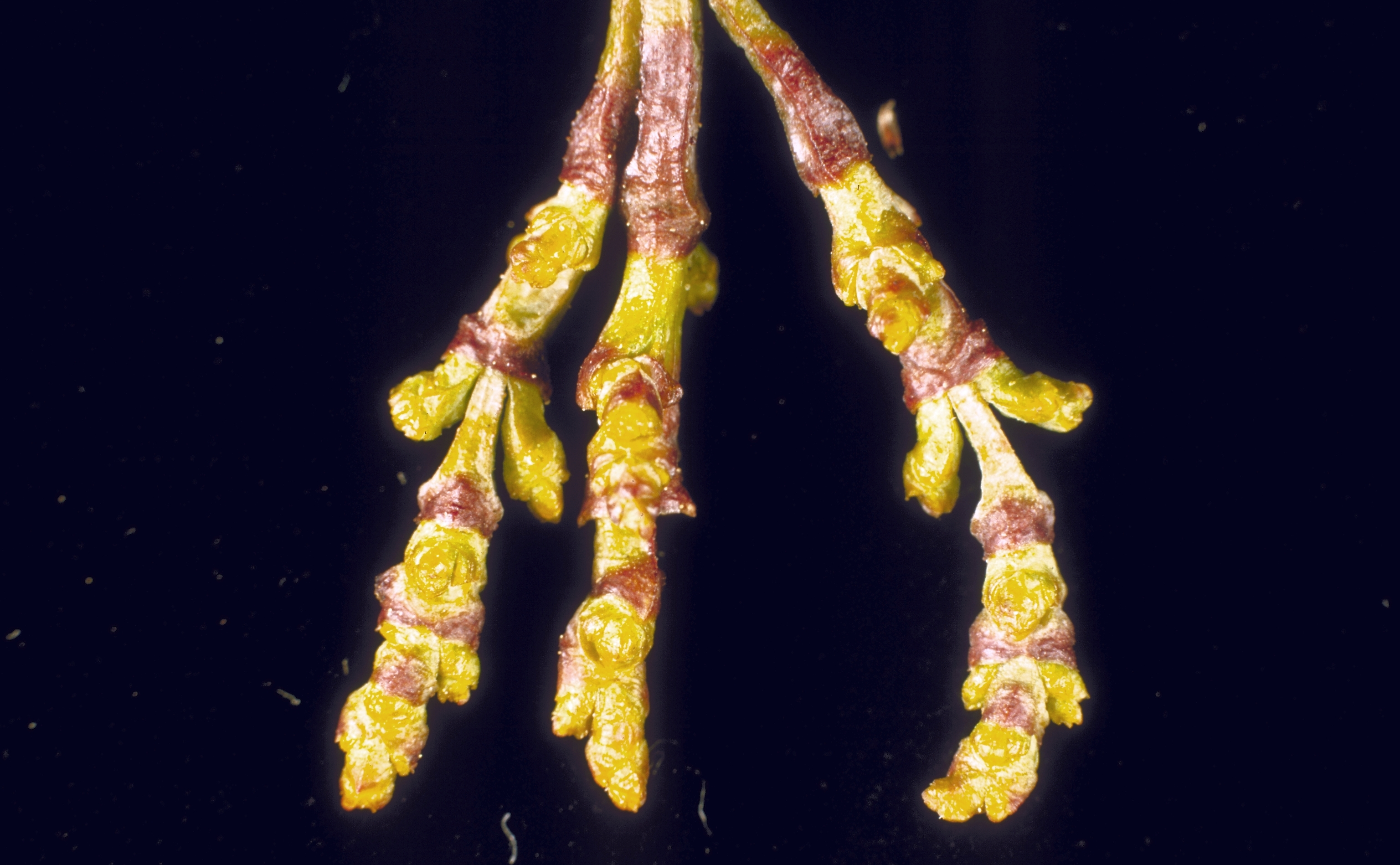

Conservation status
- Secure (NatureServe)

Scientific classification
- Kingdom: Plantae
- Clade: Embryophytes
- Clade: Tracheophytes
- Clade: Angiosperms
- Clade: Eudicots
- Order: Santalales
- Family: Santalaceae
- Genus: Arceuthobium
- Species: A. campylopodum

Binomial name
- Arceuthobium campylopodum Engelm.

Synonyms
- Razoumofskya campylopoda

= Arceuthobium campylopodum =

Species of dwarf mistletoe

Arceuthobium campylopodum, commonly known as western dwarf mistletoe, is a species of flowering plant in the family Santalaceae. It is native to the low to moderate elevation coniferous forests of western North America. Like other dwarf mistletoes, A. campylopodum parasitizes several species of conifers pine tree, including the Jeffrey pine, ponderosa pine, and Coulter pine.

The impact of A. campylopodum on the ecology and commercial productivity of conifer forests is significant. Infections by A. campylopodum decrease the vigor and longevity of host trees, induce deformed growths called witch's brooms, and increase host susceptibility to other pathogens. At the same time, A. campylopodum is an essential food source to wildlife, including some species of hairstreak butterflies whose larvae feed only on dwarf mistletoes.

Since its formal description by George Engelmann in 1850, the treatment of A. campylopodum has been a source of taxonomic contention. Some taxonomic authorities, including The Jepson Manual, apply a broad circumscription of A. campylopoda, encompassing most or all of the 13 species in the taxonomic section Campylopoda. This article applies the narrower circumscription of A. campylopoda sensu stricto.

== Description ==
=== Host affinities ===
Like other dwarf mistletoes, Arceuthobium campylopodum is a parasitic shrub that grows on and obtains water and nutrients from a conifer host. This species infects a broad range of hosts, all of which are hard pines. The principal hosts are the ponderosa pine (Pinus ponderosa subsp. ponderosa and scopulorum), the Jeffrey pine (Pinus jeffreyi), and the Coulter pine (Pinus coulteri), meaning that over 50% of trees of these species are typically infected where A. campylopodum is found. The knobcone pine (Pinus attenuata) is a secondary host, and A. campylopodum is also occasionally found on the lodgepole pine (Pinus contorta var. latifolia and murrayana) and the gray pine (Pinus sabiniana).

Host affinity is an important identifying feature of A. campylpoodum, although it is not always straightforward to identify an individual dwarf mistletoe from its host. For example, Pinus jeffreyi, P. coulteri, and P. attenuata also all serve as hosts for Arceuthobium occidentale and Arceuthobium siskiyouense, which must be distinguished by phenology and morphology. Pinus ponderosa subsp. ponderosa serves as an occasional host for A. occidentale (which can be distinguished by phenology), A. laricis (which also infects nearby Larix occidentalis or Tsuga mertensiana), and A. americanum (which can be distinguished by its whorled branching pattern) and as a rare host for A. siskiyouense (which can be distinguished by subtle morphological features and the proportion of infected P. ponderosa at a site). In the Rocky Mountains, A. vaginatum subsp. cryptopodum also infects Pinus ponderosa subsp. scopulorum, but its geographic range does not overlap with that of A. campylopodum, which only infects P. ponderosa subsp. scopulorum in the Spring Mountains of Nevada.

=== Morphology ===
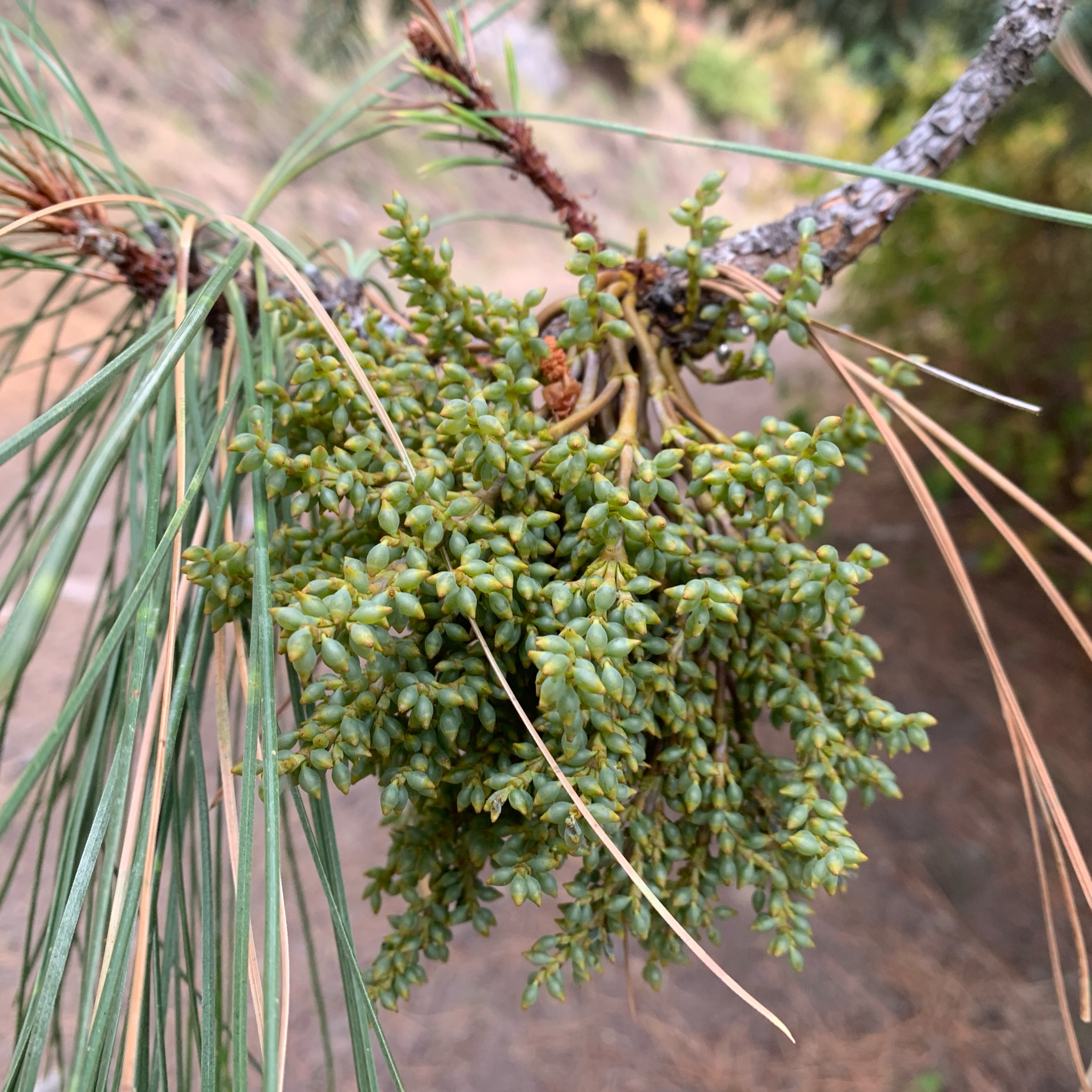
A pistillate plant growing on Pinus ponderosa in the Wallowa Mountains of northeastern Oregon, bearing fruit

The first few years of the mistletoe's life are spent developing a system of tissues within the host plant called haustoria, which tap into the host's xylem and phloem to extract water and nutrients, respectively. Once this endophytic system is developed, the plant sends out a network of aerial shoots that emerge above the bark of the host tree. These stems are green, brownish, or yellow, flabellately-branched, and approximately 10 cm long. The stems of A. campylopodum are often thicker and more robust than those of the sympatric, closely-related species A. siskiyouense and A. occidentale. The leaves are small, reduced to scales that clasp the stems. While both the stems and leaves contain chlorophyll, their photosynthetic rate is low, and the plants continue to rely on their host for the majority of their carbohydrates.

=== Flowers and reproduction ===
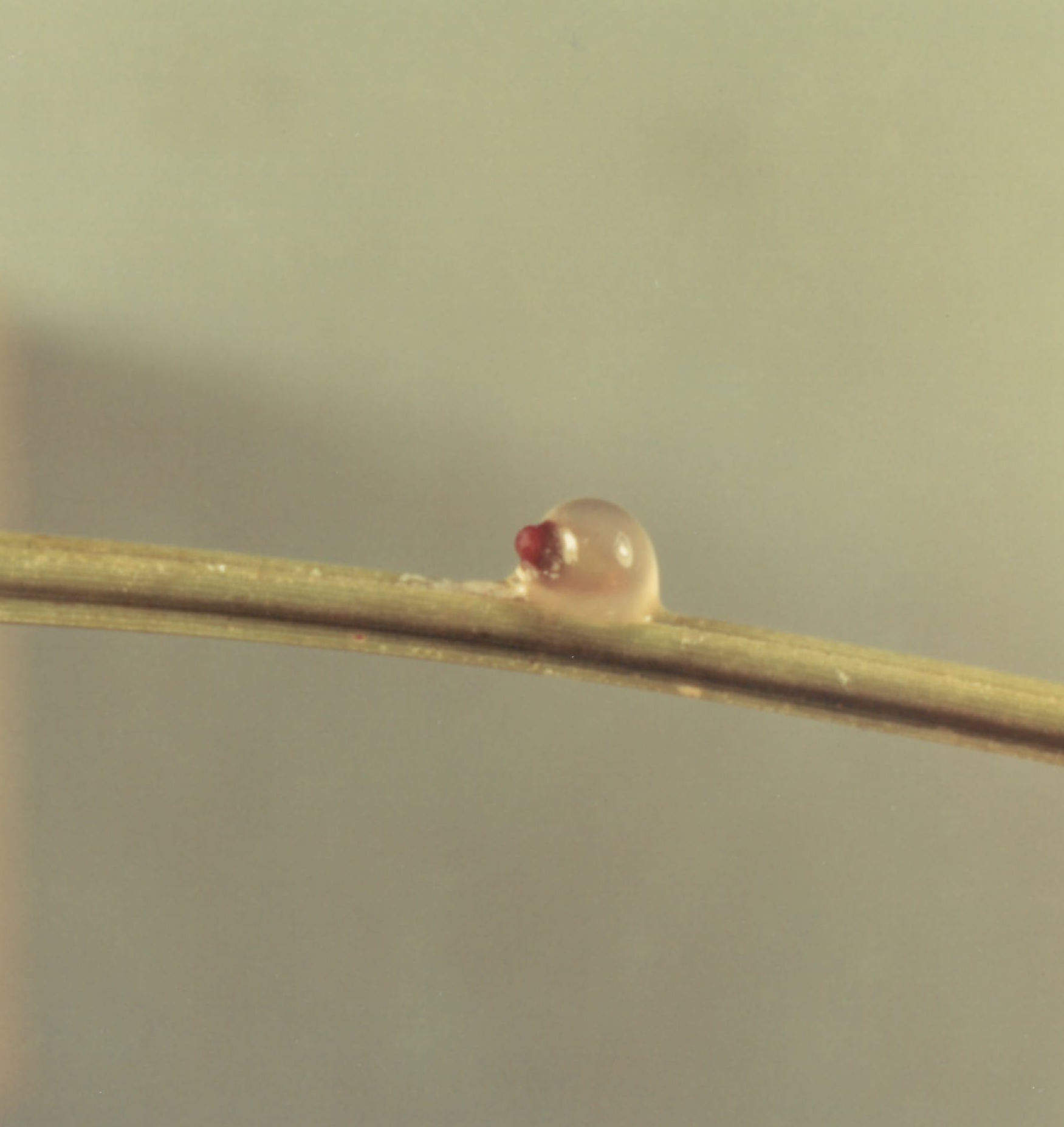
A sticky coating helps seeds of A. campylopodum attach to the foliage and branches of a potential host

Arceuthobium campylopodum is dioecious, meaning that each plant produces either male (staminate) or female (pistillate) flowers. Male flowers have three or four petals and a diameter of 3.1–4.2 mm. Anthesis occurs from mid-August to late September, with peak blooms in late August to mid-September, earlier than the closely-related A. occidentale and later than A. siskiyouense. The fruit is an oblong berry averaging 5–6 mm in length and 3 mm in width, typically light green but sometimes appearing bluish gray or glaucous because of a waxy coating. The mistletoes growing on a single host tree can together produce between 800 and 2.2 million seeds annually. Peak seed dispersal occurs from mid-September to mid-October. Hydrostatic pressure within the fruit causes the explosive ejection of the seed at an initial velocity of approximately 27 m/s (89 ft/s), with an average dispersal distance of 10.7 m. A sticky coating of a substance called viscin makes up approximately one-third the mass of the fruit and helps the seed attach to the foliage or branches of any potential host tree that it strikes.

== Ecology ==
=== Effects on host tree ===
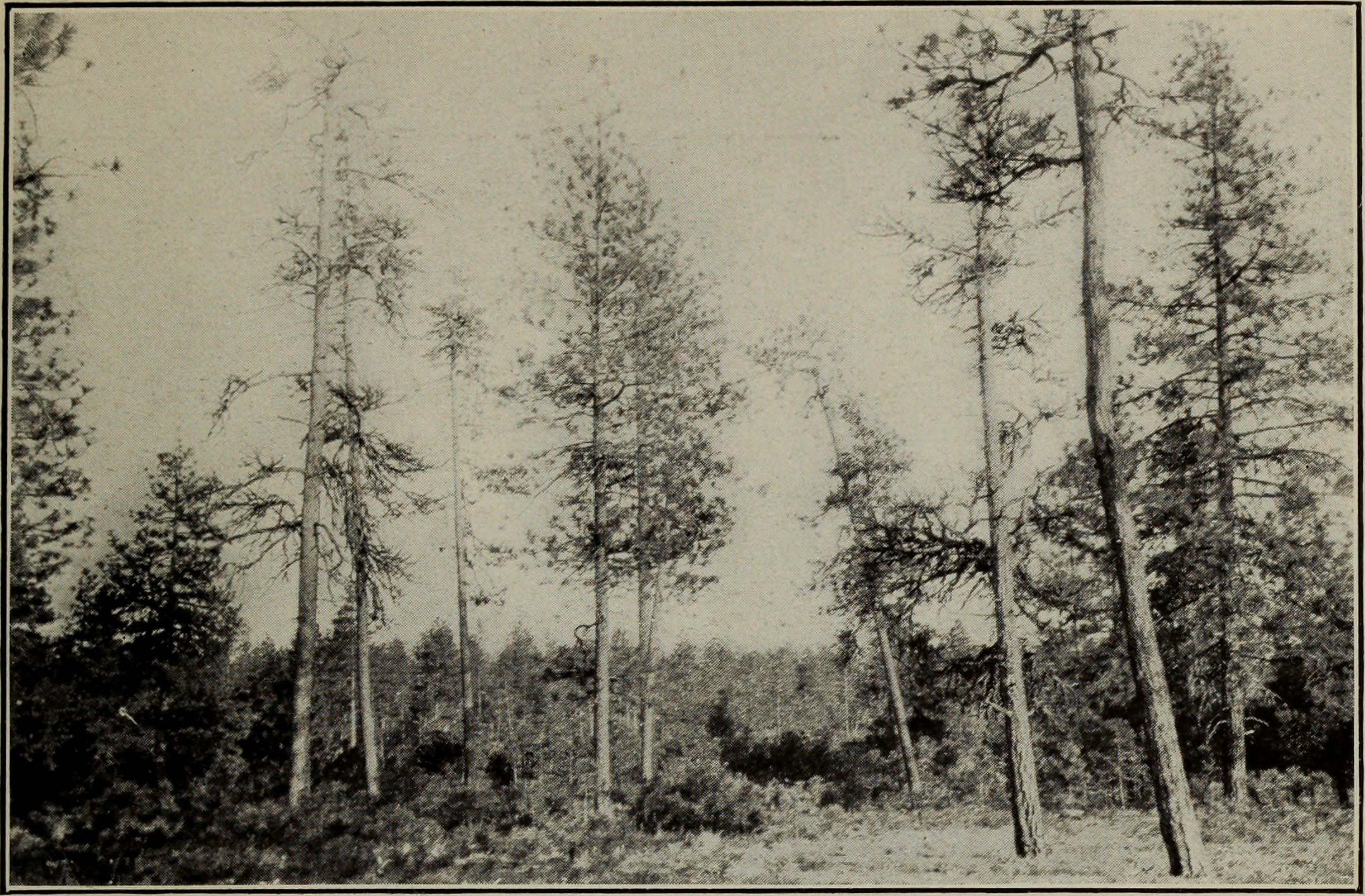
A stand of Pinus ponderosa in Washington heavily infected by A. campylopodum show dieback, reduced foliage, and witch's brooms.

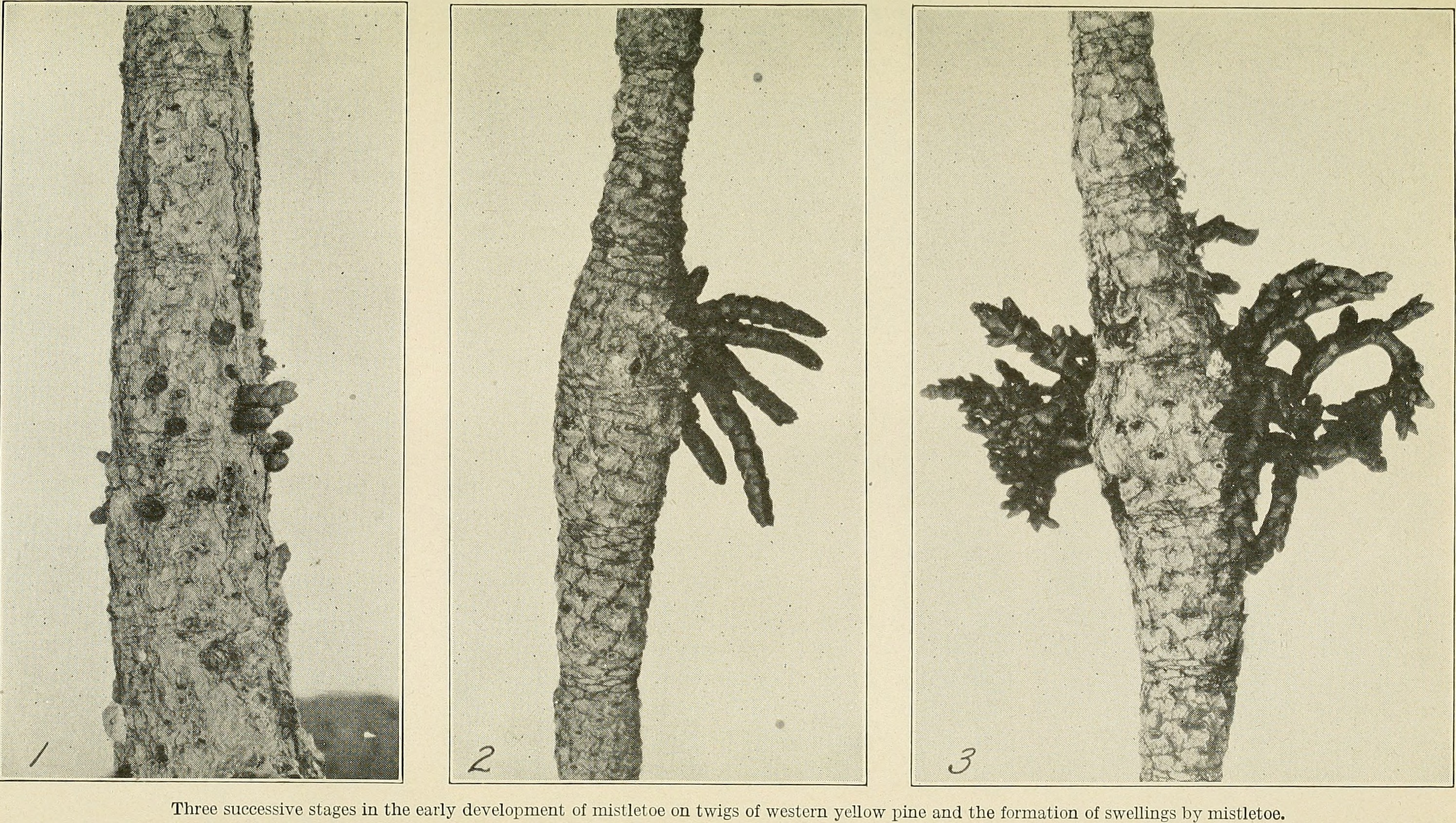
Swelling of the host branch is common near the point of infection.

Infection by A. campylopodum negatively impacts the health, seed yield, and longevity of the host tree. Infected trees are also more susceptible to fungal pathogens, which may enter the tree where the mistletoe attaches to a branch. Populations of Pinus ponderosa, P. jeffreyi, and P. coulteri, the mistletoe's principal hosts, are the most heavily affected. Juvenile trees are more susceptible to infection by A. campylopodum, and the effects of mistletoe infestations may be particularly intense in stands that have been logged in the past 50 years as the density of young trees facilitates the spread of mistletoes.

A. campylopodum also frequently induces abnormal growth in the host, including swelling and the formation of large witch's brooms. These brooms are beneficial to the mistletoe, increasing the flow of water and nutrients to its haustorium, but they further reduce the vigor and longevity of the host tree.

=== Associations with other organisms ===
The pollination biology of A. campylopodum is not well understood, although honey bees (Apis mellifera) and unidentified thrips are documented pollinators. Up to 50% of squirrels in Pinus ponderosa forests in Oregon heavily infected by A. campylopodum carry the mistletoe's seeds in their fur, suggesting that they may serve as a vector for seed dispersal.

The brooms induced by A. campylopodum in host plants serve as important microhabitats for wildlife. For example, birds and small rodents use these brooms both as nesting sites and for cover.

Several species of insects feed on A. campylopodum, including the plant bug Neoborella tumida and larvae of the thicket hairstreak butterfly (Callophrys spinetorum), Johnson's hairstreak butterfly (Callophrys johnsoni), and the snout moth Dasypyga alternosquamella. The Yellow-pine chipmunk (Neotamias amoenus) and blue grouse (Dendragapus) have also been documented using A. campylopodum as a food source.

Pinus ponderosa trees infected by A. campylopodum are more susceptible to infestation by the bark beetle Dendroctonus brevicomis. On the other hand, A. campylopodum may render host trees less suitable for bark beetle brood production by reducing the growth of bark.

Two species of fungi have been documented parasitizing A. campylopodum, an example of hyperparasitism: Colletotrichum gloeosporioides and Cylindrocarpon gillii. Infection by C. gloeosporioides causes black lesions at the nodes of mistletoe shoots and eventually leads to dieback. Infection by C. gillii (formerly called Septogloeum gillii) produces yellowish-white lesions on the stems, eventually enlarging until they erupt into masses of white spores, usually killing the mistletoe shoots.

== Distribution ==
A. campylopodum has a wide geographic distribution, largely coinciding with that of its principal host, Pinus ponderosa, through much of the western United States (Washington, Oregon, Idaho, California, and Nevada) and Baja California. Its elevational range is 30–2500 m. Many sources that describe a more expansive geographic range for A. campylopodum (for example, the Flora of North America) apply a broader taxonomic circumscription of the species, encompassing all or nearly all species in Section Campylopoda.

In Oregon and Washington, the range of A. campylopodum runs north–south on the east side of the Cascade Range and also extends through northeastern Washington and the Blue Mountains into much of western Idaho. To the south, it occurs through the Klamath-Siskiyou region in southwestern Oregon and northwestern California. The range continues southward through California along the Northern Coast Range and the Sierra Nevada, extending into Nevada around Lake Tahoe. The southern portion of the plant's distribution comprises several population systems: through the Transverse Ranges of southern California, along the Peninsular Ranges from southern California into Baja California (including in the Sierra de Juárez and Sierra de San Pedro Mártir), and in the Spring Mountains of Southern Nevada.

== Taxonomy ==
=== History ===
The type specimen of Arceuthobium campylopodum was collected by Karl Geyer, growing on Pinus ponderosa in Oregon Country, likely in what is now Washington or northern Idaho. George Engelmann formally described the species as Arceuthobium campylopodum in 1850, based on the type specimen and other collections that are now considered to represent multiple closely-related taxa.

In 1891, Otto Kuntze recombined the species as Razoumofskya campylopoda, but the genus Razoumofskya was later synonymized with Arceuthobium. In 2012, Daniel L. Nickrent recombined the taxon as A. campylopodum subsp. campylopodum based on phylogenetic results and placed all species in Arceuthobium section Campylopoda as subspecies A. campylopodum sensu lato. Other authors, including Shawn Kenaley and Robert L. Mathiasen, continue recognizing A. campylopodum sensu stricto as a single, narrowly-circumscribed species without subspecies, as described here.

According to Plants of the World Online Arceuthobium campylopodum has five synonyms.

Table of Synonyms
Name	Year	Rank	Notes
Arceuthobium campylopodum var. brachyarthron Engelm.	1850	variety	= het.
Arceuthobium campylopodum var. macrarthron Engelm.	1850	variety	= het.
Arceuthobium campylopodum f. microcarpum L.S.Gill	1935	form	= het.
Arceuthobium campylopodum f. typicum L.S.Gill	1935	form	≡ hom., not validly publ.
Razoumofskya campylopoda (Engelm.) Kuntze	1891	species	≡ hom.
Notes: ≡ homotypic synonym; = heterotypic synonym

=== Contemporary treatments ===
Because there is a lack of consensus among authorities on the taxonomy of Arceuthobium section Campylopoda, modern treatments differ in their interpretations of A. campylopodum. Plants of the World Online treats A. campylopodum in the strict sense without any subspecies, as described here, as do some regional floras, including The Oregon Flora Project, the Burke Herbarium, and the Flora of the Pacific Northwest. In contrast, the Flora of North America treats the same taxon as A. campylopodum subsp. campylopodum, with twelve other closely-related species in Arceuthobium section Campylopoda treated as subspecies of a more broadly-circumscribed A. campylopodum. The Jepson Manual applies an even broader circumscription of A. campylopodum, also lumping in the more distantly-related A. divaricatum.

=== Phylogenetic research ===
Significant effort has been made to resolve phylogenetic relationships within Campylopoda, involving morphometric, phenological, chemical, and genetic comparisons of its thirteen species. Within Campylopoda, A. campylopodum belongs to a complex of four species that are morphologically similar and all infect hard pines: A. campylopodum, A. occidentale, A. littorum, and A. siskiyouense. Host preference was traditionally used to delineate species of dwarf mistletoes, but in 1960 Job Kuijt used the lack of clear morphological differences between the taxa to advocate lumping all members of Campylopoda into A. campylopodum, which he regarded as a single, highly-variable species. In 1986, an electrophoretic study supporting Kuijt's interpretation, finding little genetic differentiation between the members of Campylopoda. A 1979 chemotaxonomic study demonstrated differences between the flavinoid profiles of some species within Campylopoda but found that A. campylopodum and A. occidentale had identical profiles, calling their distinction into question. On the other hand, several multivariate statistical analyses comparing A. campylopodum to other taxa in Campylopoda have been used to advocate the continued recognition of species boundaries in Campylopoda.

Phylogenetic studies have yielded mixed interpretations of the boundaries between taxa in Campylopoda. A 2004 study comparing nuclear ribosomal ITS sequences and chloroplast sequences of all Arceuthobium taxa confirmed the monophyly of Campylopoda but found that genetic differences between most taxa were too weak to support their treatments as distinct species. This led Nickrent to recombine all 13 taxa in Campylopoda as subspecies of A. campylopodum. In contrast, a 2021 phylogenetic study identified multiple clades within Campylopoda, supporting the recognition of at least some taxa at the species level; the samples of A. campylopodum formed a clade with those of A. occidentale, A. littorum, and one sample of A. laricis.

== Uses ==
Some Plateau Indian tribes used western dwarf mistletoe as a wash to prevent dandruff.
