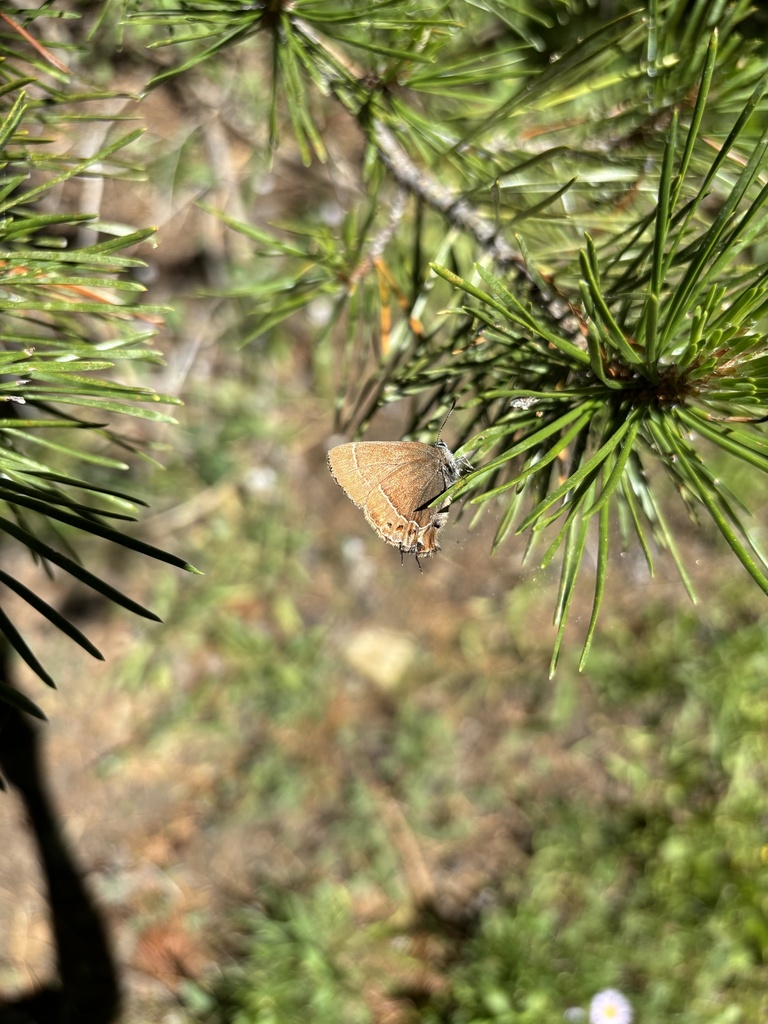

Scientific classification
- Kingdom: Animalia
- Phylum: Arthropoda
- Class: Insecta
- Order: Lepidoptera
- Family: Lycaenidae
- Genus: Callophrys
- Species: C. johnsoni

Binomial name
- Callophrys johnsoni (Skinner, 1904)

Synonyms
- Thecla johnsoni Skinner, 1904; Mitoura johnsoni; Loranthomitoura johnsoni; Callophrys (Cisincisalia) johnsoni

= Callophrys johnsoni =

Johnson's hairstreak

Species of butterfly

Callophrys johnsoni, the Johnson's hairstreak, is a butterfly of the family Lycaenidae. It is found in North America from British Columbia south to central California. The habitat consists of coniferous forests.

The wingspan is 25–30 mm. Adults are on wing from May to July in one generation per year.

The larvae are specialists that feed exclusively on dwarf mistletoes, including Arceuthobium campylopodum and A. tsugense.
