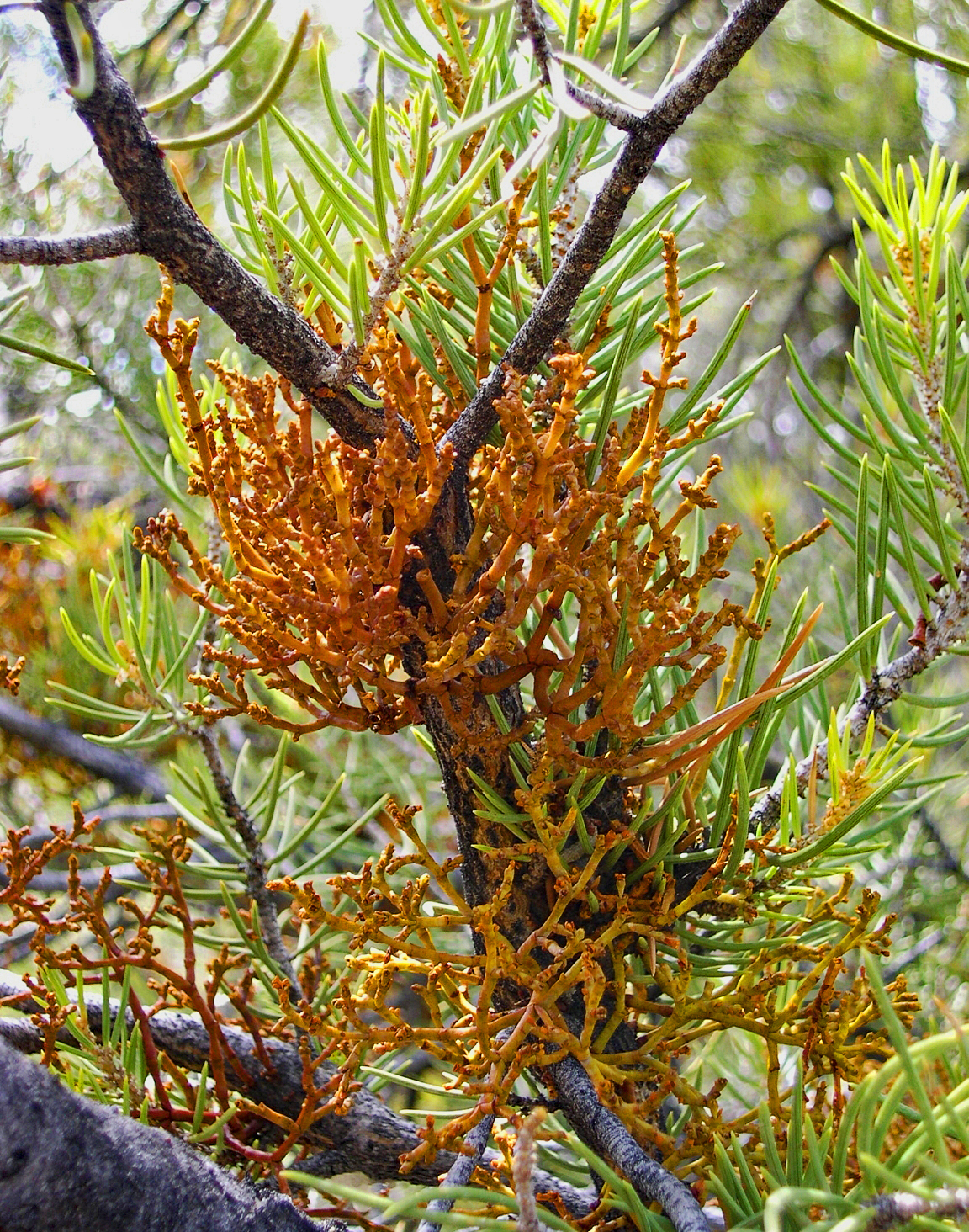

Conservation status
- Secure (NatureServe)

Scientific classification
- Kingdom: Plantae
- Clade: Embryophytes
- Clade: Tracheophytes
- Clade: Angiosperms
- Clade: Eudicots
- Order: Santalales
- Family: Santalaceae
- Genus: Arceuthobium
- Species: A. divaricatum

Binomial name
- Arceuthobium divaricatum Engelm.

Synonyms
- Razoumofskya divaricata

= Arceuthobium divaricatum =

Species of dwarf mistletoe

Arceuthobium divaricatum is a species of dwarf mistletoe known as pinyon dwarf mistletoe.

== Ecology ==
It is native to the southwestern United States and Baja California in Mexico, where it lives in woodlands as a parasite on various species of pine, particularly Colorado pinyon and single-leaf pinyon.

== Description ==
This is a small shrub which is visible as a network of scaly brown or greenish stems no more than 12 centimeters long extending above the bark of its host tree. Most of the mistletoe is located inside the host tree, attached to it via haustoria, which tap the tree for water and nutrients. The leaves of the mistletoe are reduced to thin scales on its surface. It is dioecious, with male and female mistletoe plants producing spikes of staminate and pistillate flowers, respectively. The fruit is a sticky berry a few millimeters long which explodes to disperse the seeds it contains several meters away from the parent plant and its host tree.

== Taxonomy ==
Arceuthobium divaricatum was scientifically described and named by George Engelmann in 1878. It is classified in the Arceuthobium genus as part of the Santalaceae and has no accepted varieties, but was described as a variety of Arceuthobium campylopodum by Willis Linn Jepson in 1923. Altogether it has three homotypic synonyms.

Table of Synonyms
Name	Year	Rank
Arceuthobium campylopodum var. divaricatum (Engelm.) Jeps.	1923	variety
Arceuthobium campylopodum f. divaricatum (Engelm.) L.S.Gill	1935	form
Razoumofskya divaricata (Engelm.) Coville	1893	species
