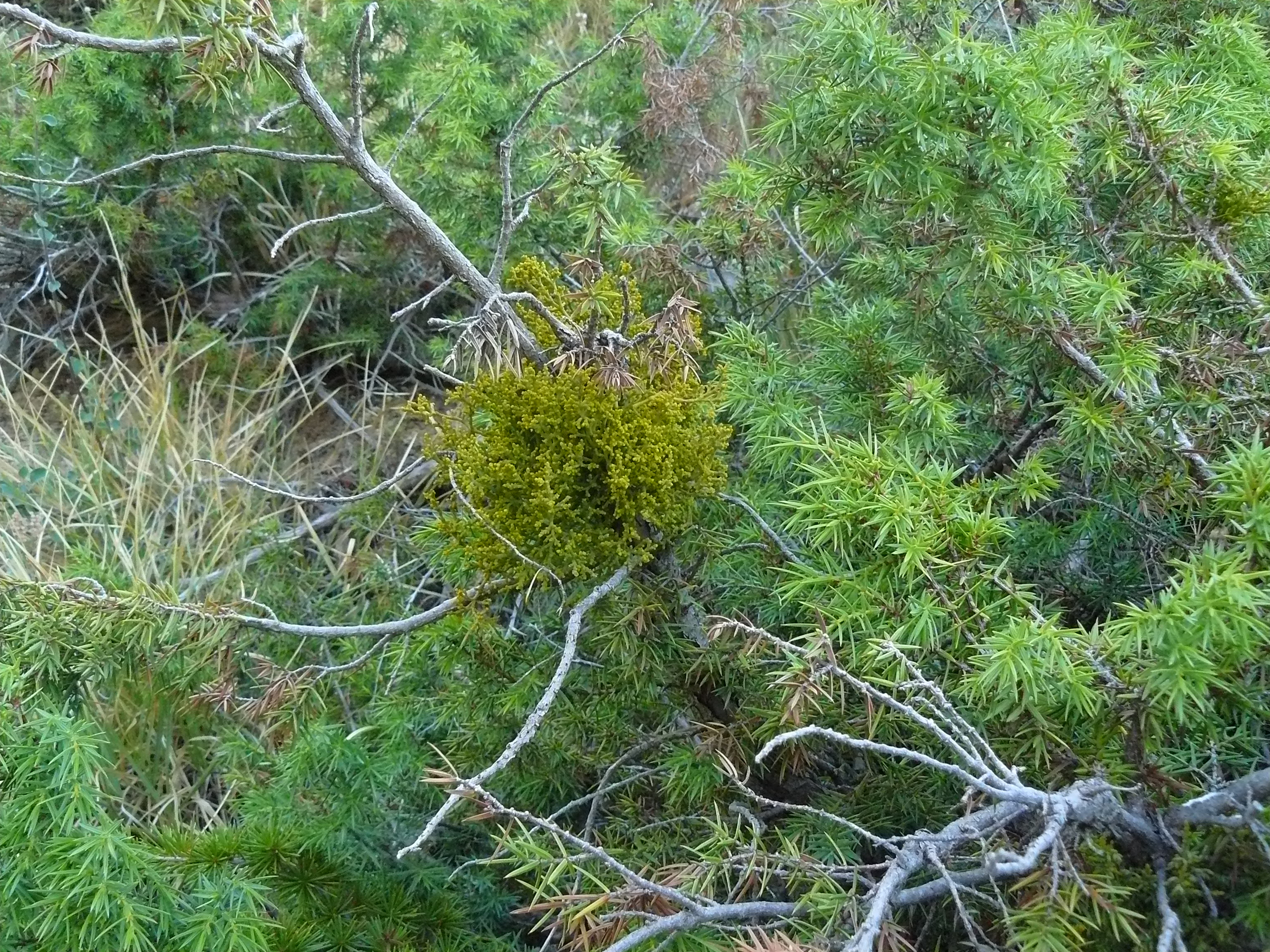
- Arceuthobium oxycedri

Conservation status
- Least Concern (IUCN 3.1)

Scientific classification
- Kingdom: Plantae
- Clade: Tracheophytes
- Clade: Angiosperms
- Clade: Eudicots
- Order: Santalales
- Family: Santalaceae
- Genus: Arceuthobium
- Species: A. oxycedri

Binomial name
- Arceuthobium oxycedri (DC.) M.Bieb.

= Arceuthobium oxycedri =

Juniper dwarf mistletoe

Species of plant

Arceuthobium oxycedri, juniper dwarf mistletoe, is a hemiparasite of the family Santalaceae. It parasitizes members of the genus Juniperus, especially Juniperus oxycedrus and Juniperus communis.

== Description ==
The juniper mistletoe is small in size averaging between 2 and 15 cm. This dioecious plant has a very small stem and the leaves consist of small sheets with sessile flowers. It is distributed throughout much of Europe, Asia and parts of northern Africa.

== Taxonomy ==
Arceuthobium oxycedri was described by Friedrich August von Marschall Bieberstein and published in Flora Tauric-Caucasica 3: 629, in 1819.

== Synonyms ==
- Arceuthobium juniperi Bubani
- Razoumofskya oxycedri ( DC. ) FWSchultz ex Nyman
- Caucasica Razoumowskia sloth. former M.Bieb.
- Razoumowskia oxycedri (DC.) FWSchultz
- Viscum caucasicum Steud.
- Viscum oxycedri DC.
