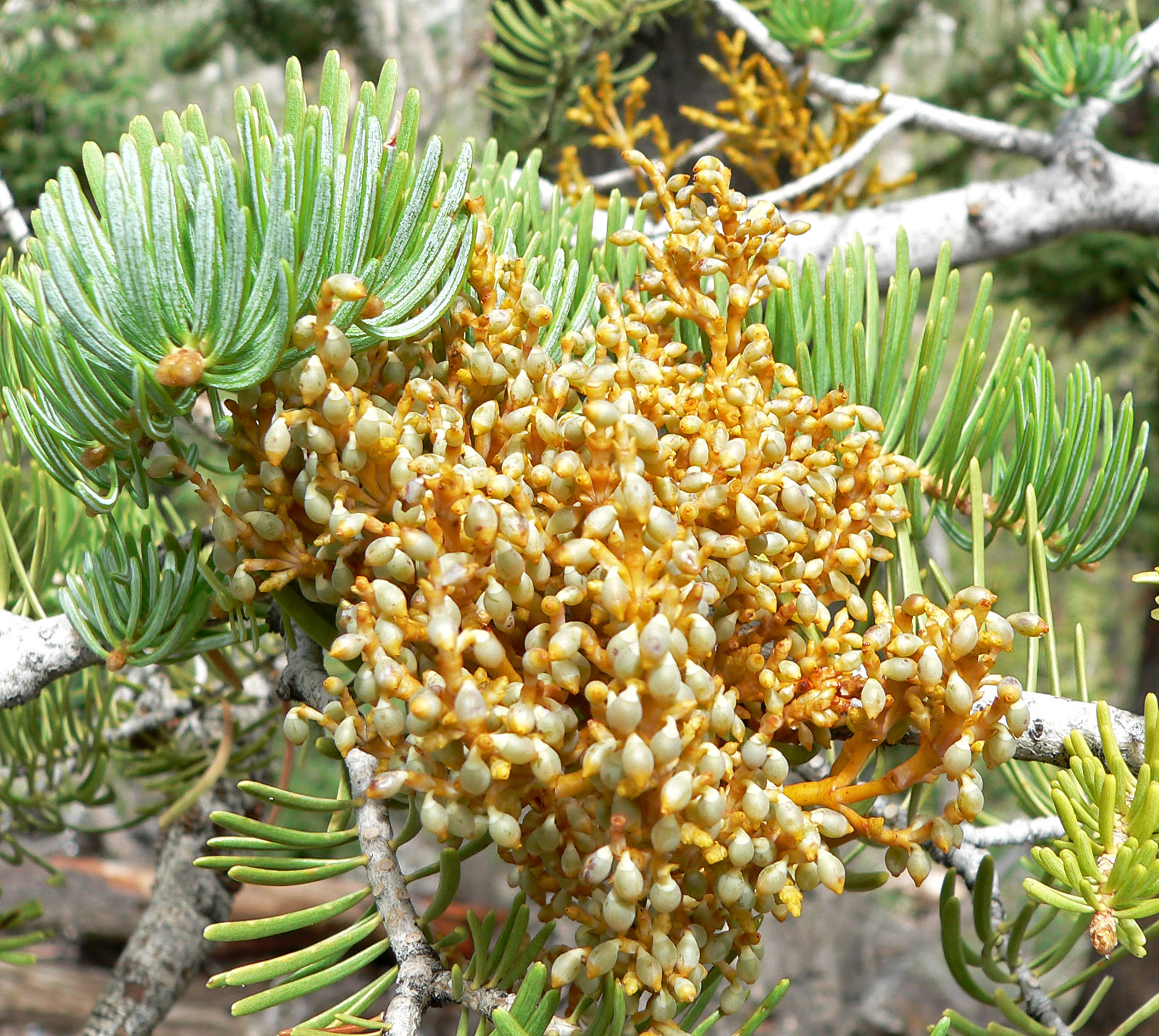
- Arceuthobium abietinum

Scientific classification
- Kingdom: Plantae
- Clade: Embryophytes
- Clade: Tracheophytes
- Clade: Angiosperms
- Clade: Eudicots
- Order: Santalales
- Family: Santalaceae
- Genus: Arceuthobium; M.Bieb.

Species
- See list of Arceuthobium species

Synonyms
- Razoumofskya Hoffm.

= Arceuthobium =

Dwarf mistletoes Temporal range: 43–0 Ma

Genus of mistletoes

The genus Arceuthobium, commonly called dwarf mistletoes, is a genus of 42 species of parasitic plants that parasitize members of Pinaceae and Cupressaceae in North America, Central America, Asia, Europe, and Africa. Of the 42 species that have been recognized, 39 and 21 of these are endemic to North America and the United States, respectively. They all have very reduced shoots and leaves (mostly reduced to scales) with the bulk of the plant living under the host's bark. Recently the number of species within the genus has been reduced to 26 as a result of more detailed genetic analysis.

== Description ==
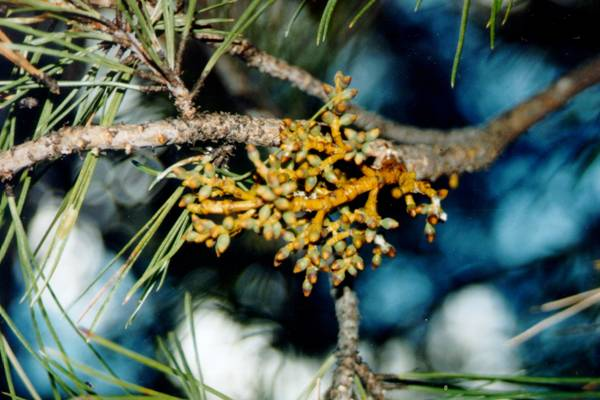
Female plant of A. vaginatum susbp. cryptopodum on Ponderosa pine

Arceuthobium species are dioecious, individual plants being either male or female. The fruit is unusual in that it builds up hydrostatic pressure internally when ripe and shoots the single sticky seed up to speeds nearly 50 miles per hour (80 km/h), an example of rapid plant movement. The lodgepole pine dwarf mistletoe, Arceuthobium americanum, has been found to explosively-disperse its seeds through thermogenesis. Dwarf mistletoe seeds are enveloped in a hygroscopic, glue-like substance called viscin. Many fail to land on a suitable host's shoot, but some succeed, and in this way they are spread through the forests as a pest front. The spread of dwarf mistletoes in forest stands is greatest from the overstory to the understory, owing to gravity. Advantageous stand conditions for the spread of the parasite include an uneven-aged stand structure with severely infected hosts in dominant and codominant crown classes, species composition dominated by the primary host, and tree densities between 175 and 500 trees/ha.

There are also several species from Europe and Asia. In particular, Arceuthobium minutissimum, which lives primarily on Pinus wallichiana in the Himalayas, produces the smallest shoots of any member of the genus. It is also the smallest known dicotyledonous plant.

== Effects of parasitism ==
In western forest ecosystems of North America, numerous dwarf mistletoe species are considered to be serious forest-borne disease agents. Severe dwarf mistletoe infection can result in a reduction in tree growth, premature tree mortality, reduced seed and cone development, and reduced wood quality, and increases the susceptibility of the host tree to pathogen and/or insect attack. Most of the commercially important conifers in western North America are parasitized by one or more dwarf mistletoes.

The interaction between dwarf mistletoes and their host can be generalized as a source-to-sink relationship. Dwarf mistletoes derive the majority of their nutrition from the host's vascular tissues. Dwarf mistletoes have a root-like endophytic system, composed of primary and secondary haustoria, which invade, but do not injure, both the xylem and phloem of the host. Because this root-like endophytic system is not soilborne, dwarf mistletoes are dependent solely on their host for water. Along a xylem-to-xylem link, dwarf mistletoes draw water from their host using the difference in water potential between parasite and host. The greater transpiration rate of the dwarf mistletoe produces a lower water potential, allowing water to flow from host to parasite. The water gradient or transpiration stream is consistently maintained, even when the host is under moderate water deficit.

In addition to host-water dependence, dwarf mistletoes must acquire carbohydrate and mineral nutrition from their hosts. Dwarf mistletoes have both chlorophyll a and chlorophyll b and the necessary mechanisms for photosynthesis, but chlorophyll concentrations in dwarf mistletoes are approximately 1/5 to 1/10 of those found in their host's foliage, and dwarf mistletoes have low photosynthetic rates as measured by the rate of carbon fixation. The principal carbohydrate transported from the host to dwarf mistletoe is sucrose. Because dwarf mistletoes are phloem-deficient, they draw carbohydrates from their hosts by connections to the host phloem and ray parenchyma. The rate of carbohydrate transport varies by season, but dwarf mistletoes continuously draw carbohydrates from their hosts throughout the year.

== Dwarf mistletoe rating system ==
A standardized system called the Hawksworth 6-class dwarf mistletoe rating (DMR) system has been devised to determine how much dwarf mistletoe has infected a tree. To use this system, the living part of the tree crown needs to be broken up into 3 sections, (top, middle, bottom). Each section is then rated either 0, 1, or 2 with a score of 0 being assigned for a uninfected section, 1 for light infection with fewer than half of the branches infected, or 2 for heavy infection with over half of the branches infected. The 3 numbers are then added together to give the total rating for the tree.

== Species ==
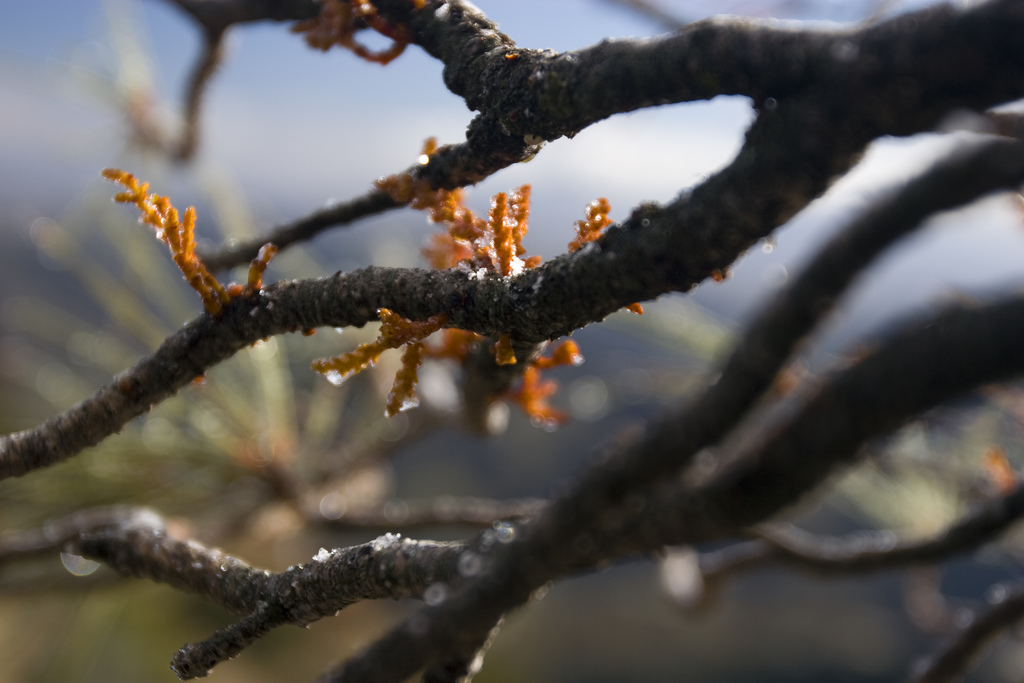
Arceuthobium occidentale shoots on Pinus sabiniana branches, Mount Diablo, California. 25 December 2008

- Arceuthobium abietinum Engelm. ex Munz
- Arceuthobium americanum Nutt. ex Engelm.
- Arceuthobium apachecum Hawksworth & Wiens
- Arceuthobium azoricum Hawksw. & Wiens
- Arceuthobium blumeri A. Nels.
- Arceuthobium californicum Hawksworth & Wiens
- Arceuthobium campylopodum Engelm.
- †Arceuthobium conwentzii Sadowski et al. 2017
- Arceuthobium cyanocarpum (A. Nels. ex Rydb.) A. Nels.
- Arceuthobium divaricatum Engelm.
- Arceuthobium douglasii Engelm.
- Arceuthobium gillii Hawksworth & Wiens
- Arceuthobium globosum Hawksw. & Wiens
- †Arceuthobium groehnii Sadowski et al. 2017
- †Arceuthobium johnianum (Göppert & Berendt) Sadowski et al. 2017
- Arceuthobium laricis (Piper) St. John
- Arceuthobium littorum Hawksworth, Wiens & Nickrent
- †Arceuthobium mengeanum (Göppert in Göppert & Menge) Sadowski et al. 2017
- Arceuthobium microcarpum (Engelm.) Hawksworth & Wiens
- Arceuthobium minutissimum Hook. f.
- Arceuthobium monticola Hawksworth, Wiens & Nickrent
- †Arceuthobium obovatum Sadowski et al. 2017
- Arceuthobium occidentale Engelm.
- Arceuthobium oxycedri (DC.) M.Bieb.
- Arceuthobium pusillum Peck
- Arceuthobium siskiyouense Hawksworth, Wiens & Nickrent
- Arceuthobium tsugense (Rosendahl) G.N. Jones
- Arceuthobium vaginatum (Humb. & Bonpl. ex Willd.) J. Presl (Syn. Viscum vaginatum Humb. & Bonpl. ex Willd.)
- Arceuthobium viscoides (Göppert & Berendt) Sadowski et al. 2017

== See also ==
- Frankliniella hawksworthi
- Caliciopsis arceuthobii
