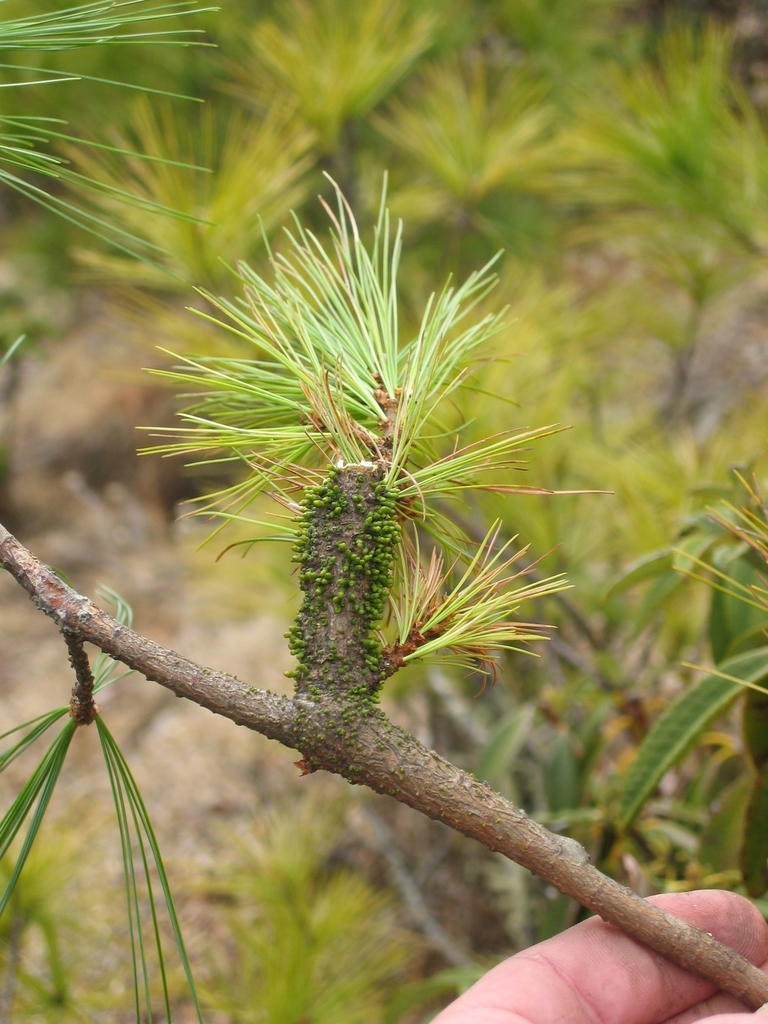
- A. minutissimum photographed on Pinus wallichiana in Bhutan

Scientific classification
- Kingdom: Plantae
- Clade: Tracheophytes
- Clade: Angiosperms
- Clade: Eudicots
- Order: Santalales
- Family: Santalaceae
- Genus: Arceuthobium
- Species: A. minutissimum

Binomial name
- Arceuthobium minutissimum Hook.f.

Synonyms
- Razoumowskia minutissima Tubeuf

= Arceuthobium minutissimum =

Species of dwarf mistletoe

Arceuthobium minutissimum, known as the Indian dwarf mistletoe or Himalayan dwarf mistletoe, is a leafless parasitic plant of Pinus wallichiana. It is considered the smallest known dicotyledonous plant.

== Description ==
Individual shoots grow to a height of 5 millimeters, and up to 1 centimeter with mature fruit. Shoots emerge from both the cortex and needles of the host plant. Flowers are monoecious, and seed dispersal occurs in September.

== Distribution and host species ==
The species occurs in dry forests of the Himalayan mountains at an approximate altitude of 2500–3500 meters. It has been reported in Nepal, India, Bhutan, and Pakistan. A. minutissimum infects the crowns of trees of all ages. It severely impacts the health of host-trees, and causes the loss of needles. Although P. wallichiana is the primary host, it has been recorded to infect Pinus gerardiana in Pakistan. Unconfirmed reports show that it may also infect Abies pindrow and Cedrus deodara.

It has been considered that there is potential for A. minutissimum to become an invasive species in Europe.

== See also ==
- Smallest organisms
