= Frank Goode Hawksworth =

American botanist and forester

- Born: April 30, 1926; Fresno, California, United States
- Died: January 8, 1993 (aged 66); Fort Collins, Colorado, United States
- Known for: Specialist in Santalaceae, especially Arceuthobium
- Scientific career
- Fields: Botany, Forestry
- Institutions: United States Forest Service
- Author abbrev. (botany): Hawksw.

Frank Goode Hawksworth (30 April 1926 – 8 January 1993) was an American botanist and forester who was recognized as the leading international specialist in the study of the biology and taxonomy of the family Santalaceae, particularly the genus Arceuthobium. As a forester, he specialized in forest pathology, with a focus on epiphytic parasitic plants.

Hawksworth carried out botanical expeditions in Guatemala, Honduras, Mexico, and the United States.

He developed and in 1977 published a scale for rating mistletoe's presence on trees known as the Hawksworth 6-class dwarf mistletoe rating (DMR) system.

== Publications ==
=== Books ===
- 1996. Dwarf Mistletoes: Biology, Pathology, and Systematics. With Delbert Wiens. Agriculture Handbook 709. Washington, D.C.: United States Department of Agriculture, Forest Service. 418 pp. ISBN 0788142011, ISBN 9780788142017.

== Honours ==
=== Eponyms ===
Insects

- (Thripidae) Frankliniella hawksworthi, a thrips species that attacks dwarf mistletoes.

Plants

- (Viscaceae) Arceuthobium hawksworthii Wiens & C.G. Shaw Jr..
- (Viscaceae) Phoradendron hawksworthii Wiens.
