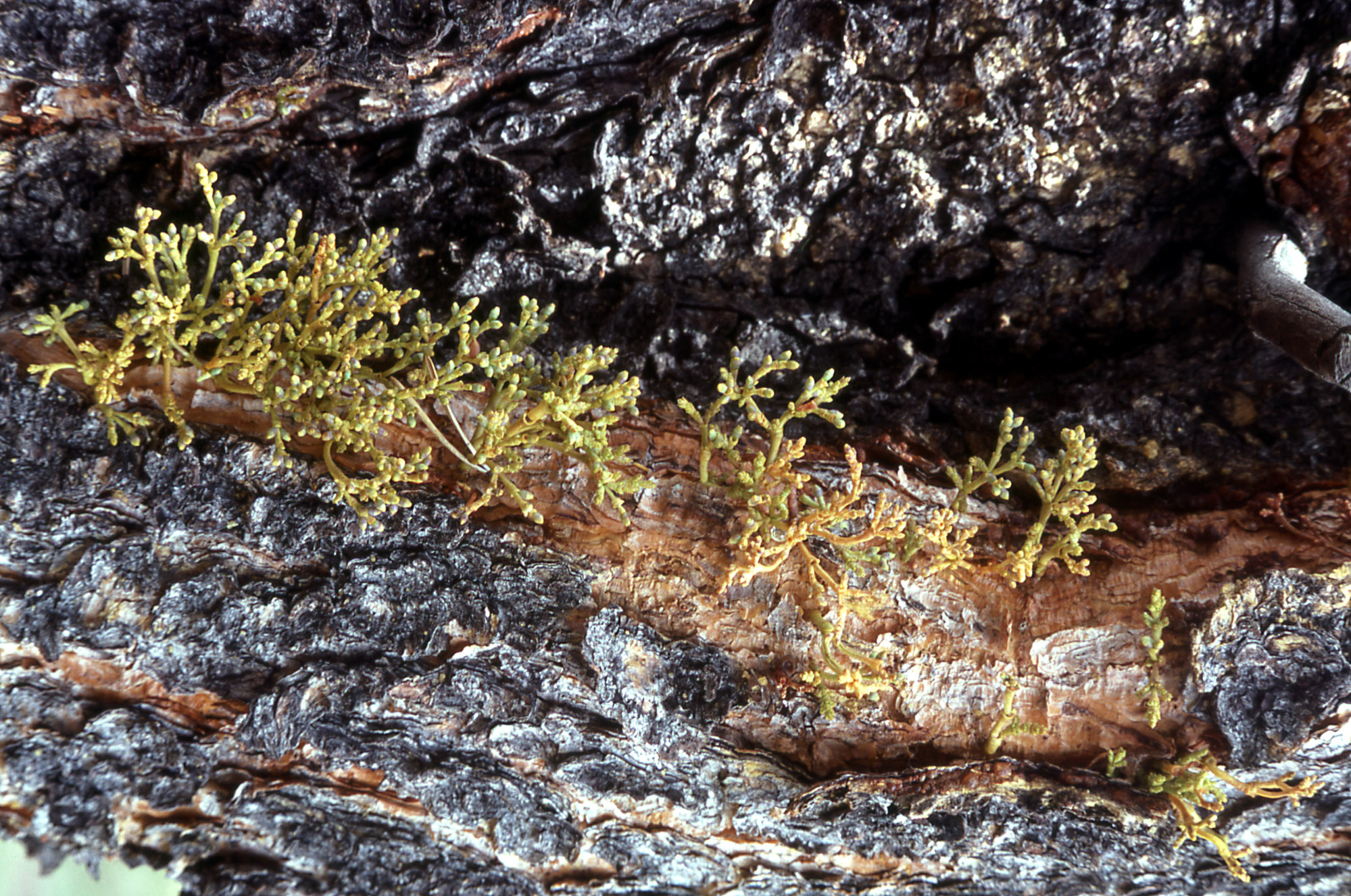

Conservation status
- Secure (NatureServe)

Scientific classification
- Kingdom: Plantae
- Clade: Embryophytes
- Clade: Tracheophytes
- Clade: Angiosperms
- Clade: Eudicots
- Order: Santalales
- Family: Santalaceae
- Genus: Arceuthobium
- Species: A. americanum

Binomial name
- Arceuthobium americanum Nutt. ex Engelm.

Synonyms
- Razoumofskya americana

= Arceuthobium americanum =

Species of dwarf mistletoe

Arceuthobium americanum is a species of dwarf mistletoe known as American dwarf mistletoe and lodgepole-pine dwarf mistletoe. It is a common plant of western North America where it lives in high elevation pine forests. It is a parasitic plant which lives upon the Lodgepole Pine, particularly the subspecies Pinus contortus ssp. murrayana, the Tamarack Pine. This pine subspecies is most common in the Cascade Range and Sierra Nevada. The American dwarf mistletoe is a yellow-green coral-shaped structure above the surface of the tree's bark, while most of the parasite is beneath the bark. The seeds mature in late summer and disperse to nearby trees. This species has been found to explosively-disperse its seeds through thermogenesis.

The parasitic plant is dioecious, meaning that it has separate male and female parts. Studies of pine needles from infected trees have shown decreased starch content in the needles of infected trees. Furthermore, differences have been found in the positioning of the vascular bundles between female infected pine trees and male infected pine trees.

Three hyperparasitic fungi are known to parasitize A. douglasii: Caliciopsis arceuthobii, which infects the female flowers and fruit, Colletotrichum gloeosporioides, which causes black lesions at the stem nodes, and Cylindrocarpon gillii, which causes yellow-white lesions along the stems.

== Taxonomy ==
Arceuthobium americanum was scientifically described and named by George Engelmann in 1850, who attributed the species to Thomas Nuttall. It is classified in the genus Arceuthobium which is part of the Santalaceae family. The species has no subspecies and one homotypic synonym from 1891 when Otto Kuntze proposed moving it to the genus Razoumofskya.
