= Flora of North America =

Book, website, and database

The Flora of North America North of Mexico (usually referred to as FNA) is a multivolume work describing the native plants and naturalized plants of North America, including the United States, Canada, St. Pierre and Miquelon, and Greenland. It includes bryophytes and vascular plants. All taxa are described and included in dichotomous keys, distributions of all species and infraspecific taxa are mapped, and about 20% of species are illustrated with line drawings prepared specifically for FNA. It is expected to fill 30 volumes when completed and will be the first work to treat all of the known flora north of Mexico; in 2015 it was expected that the series would conclude in 2017. Twenty-four of the volumes have been published as of 2024.

Soon after publication, the contents are made available online.

FNA is a collaboration of about 1,000 authors, artists, reviewers, and editors from throughout the world.

== Reception ==
The series has been praised for "the comprehensive treatments [that] allow botanists to examine taxonomic and geographical traits of genera across the North American continent, rather than being limited by keys developed for one's own state or region".

Reviewing volume 3, University of Wyoming science librarian Paula Wolfe found the series worth recommending, and praised it for high standards.
