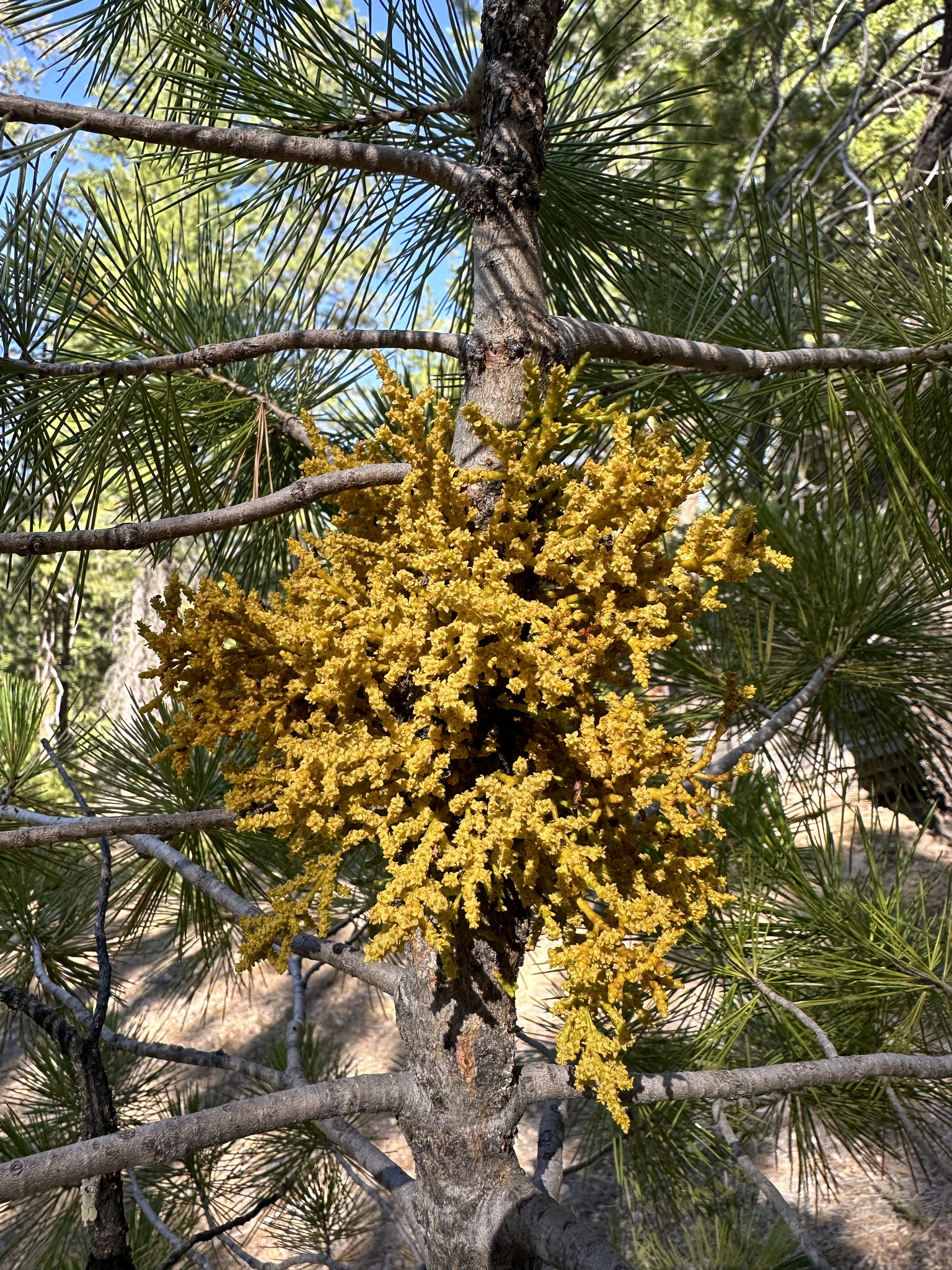

Scientific classification
- Kingdom: Plantae
- Clade: Tracheophytes
- Clade: Angiosperms
- Clade: Eudicots
- Order: Santalales
- Family: Santalaceae
- Genus: Arceuthobium
- Species: A. californicum

Binomial name
- Arceuthobium californicum Hawksw. & Wiens

Synonyms
- "Arceuthobium campylopodum" subsp. "californicum" (Hawksw. & Wiens) Nickrent

= Arceuthobium californicum =

Species of flowering plant

Arceuthobium californicum is a species of dwarf mistletoe commonly known as sugar pine dwarf mistletoe. It is a small shrub endemic to California that parasitizes the sugar pine (Pinus lambertiana). Although detrimental to the health of its host, it is ecologically important as a food source for wildlife and because the witch's brooms that it sometimes induces on host trees provide valuable habitat for birds and small rodents.

== Description ==
All dwarf mistletoes, including A. californicum, grow inside and on coniferous hosts, which they parasitize. The only species susceptible to infection by A. californicum is the sugar pine. For the first few years of the mistletoe's life, it grows entirely within a young branch or trunk of its host, developing tissues called haustoria. This enables the mistletoe to tap into the tree's xylem and phloem to extract water and carbohydrates, respectively.

Eventually, a system of thin, flabellately branched stems emerges from the host tree. These shoots range from 6 to 10 cm in length and are distinctly yellow or greenish in color, often with brownish bases where they meet the host tree. The primary function of these shoots is reproduction: indeed, although the stems and the small, scale-like leaves that they bear contain some chlorophyll, they photosynthesize at a low rate.

As with most other species of dwarf mistletoes, A. californicum is dioecious, meaning that plants produce either male or female flowers. Male (staminate) flowers are approximately 3 mm wide, have 3–4 petals, and bloom from mid-June to late-July or August with peak flowering in July. The fruit is an oblong berry approximately 4–5 mm long, greenish, and slightly glaucous. Despite an earlier bloom time than most other dwarf mistletoes in California, fruit of A. californicum mature and are dispersed around the same time as other species, from September to mid-October. Seed dispersal happens explosively, with the release of hydrostatic pressure inside the fruit expelling the seed at an initial velocity of 27 m/s (89 ft/s). Seeds are coated in a sticky substance called viscin that allows them to adhere to the branches of their targets, although ultimately only one to two percent of seeds successfully germinate and infect a host.

Because of their reduced morphology, species of dwarf mistletoe are difficult to distinguish. The two other species of dwarf mistletoe specializing on white pines in California are A. monticola and A. cyanocarpum, both of which occasionally parasitize sugar pine. However, A. californicum is the only species of mistletoe whose primary host is the sugar pine and the only species to parasitize sugar pine exclusively. Phenology also separates A. californicum from these other two species, both of which flower later, from mid-July to September. Morphologically, A. californicum is also identifiable based on its size (with A. monticola and A. cyanocarpum significantly larger and smaller, respectively) and consistently yellow or green color.

== Distribution ==
The range of A. californicum lies entirely within the range of its host, Pinus lambertiana, but it has a narrower geographic and elevational range than its host. In particular, A. californicum is limited to California; earlier reports of its presence in southwestern Oregon represent the previously undescribed species A. monticola. This makes A. californicum one of three species of mistletoe endemic to California, the others being A. littorum and A. occidentale.

The northern part of its distribution consists of scattered populations in the Klamath Mountains (northward to Dillon Mountain) and the North Coast Range (southward to Clear Lake). A more continuous portion of its distribution covers the west side of the Sierra Nevada. Three more isolated populations exist in the San Bernardino Mountains, San Jacinto Mountains, and Cuyamaca Mountains in southern California. Its elevational range is 600–2000 meters.

== Ecology ==
Infection by dwarf mistletoes reduces the longevity of the host tree and renders it more vulnerable to co-infection by fungal pathogens and by bark beetles, including Dendroctonus monticolae. Moreover, A. californicum regularly induces abnormal growth in the host tree called witch's brooms. These brooms are globose arrangements of irregularly-shaped branches, and their presence increases a site's susceptibility to wildfire. While broom formation negatively impacts the health of the host tree, it also provides a unique habitat type used by birds and small mammals for nesting and cover.

Several species of hairstreak butterflies depend on dwarf mistletoes as a larval food source, including Callophrys johnsoni and Callophrys spinetorum, although it is not known whether any species feed on A. californicum or if they exclusively use closely-related species such as A. campylopodum.

In an example of hyperparasitism, at least two species of fungi have been documented parasitizing A. californicum, namely Colletotrichum gloeosporioides and Cylindrocarpon gillii. Both species are known to parasitize a wide range of hosts, although the latter species only parasitizes dwarf mistletoes. Mistletoes infected by C. gloeosporioides develop small, black lesions on their shoots and fruit, which eventually enlarge and cause dieback. Those infected by C. gillii develop yellowish-white lesions on their shoots, erupting in white masses of spores. Both species are considered natural biocontrol agents of A. californicum.

== Taxonomy ==
The type specimen of A. californicum was collected by Frank Hawksworth in 1968 near Fish Camp in Mariposa County, California, and the species was formally described two years later, in 1970. The epithet californicum refers to its geographic range.

The closely-related Arceuthobium monticola (parasitic on western white pine, sugar pine, and Brewer's spruce) was originally considered conspecific with A. californicum, although that species was recognized as distinct in 1992 based on differences in morphology, phenology, and host preference. A 1991 study by Daniel Nickrent and Therese Butler used isozyme analysis to compare A. californicum and four other closely-related dwarf mistletoe species native to the Klamath Mountains (A. campylopodum, A. littorum, A. monticola, and A. siskiyouense) finding significant enough differences in allele frequencies among the taxa to support recognizing the taxa as distinct species.

In 2012, phylogenetic work comparing nuclear ribosomal ITS and chloroplast sequences of dwarf mistletoes revealed little genetic differentiation between most members of Section Campylopoda, the clade containing A. californicum. Nickrent interpreted these results as indicating that most or all members of Campylopoda belong to a single, highly-variable species, leading him to treat A. californicum as a subspecies of a more broadly-circumscribed A. campylopodum. Morphological data has been used to advocate the continued recognition of A. californicum as a distinct species.

Because species boundaries in Section Campylopoda are poorly understood, taxonomic authorities disagree on the status of A. californicum. Plants of the World Online recognizes A. californicum as a species. Following Nickrent's interpretation of Section Campylopoda, Flora of North America treats the taxon instead at the subspecific level, with the name A. campylopodum subsp. californicum. In contrast, The Jepson Manual considers A. monticola a synonym of A. campylopodum, along with all other members of Section Campylopoda native to California.
