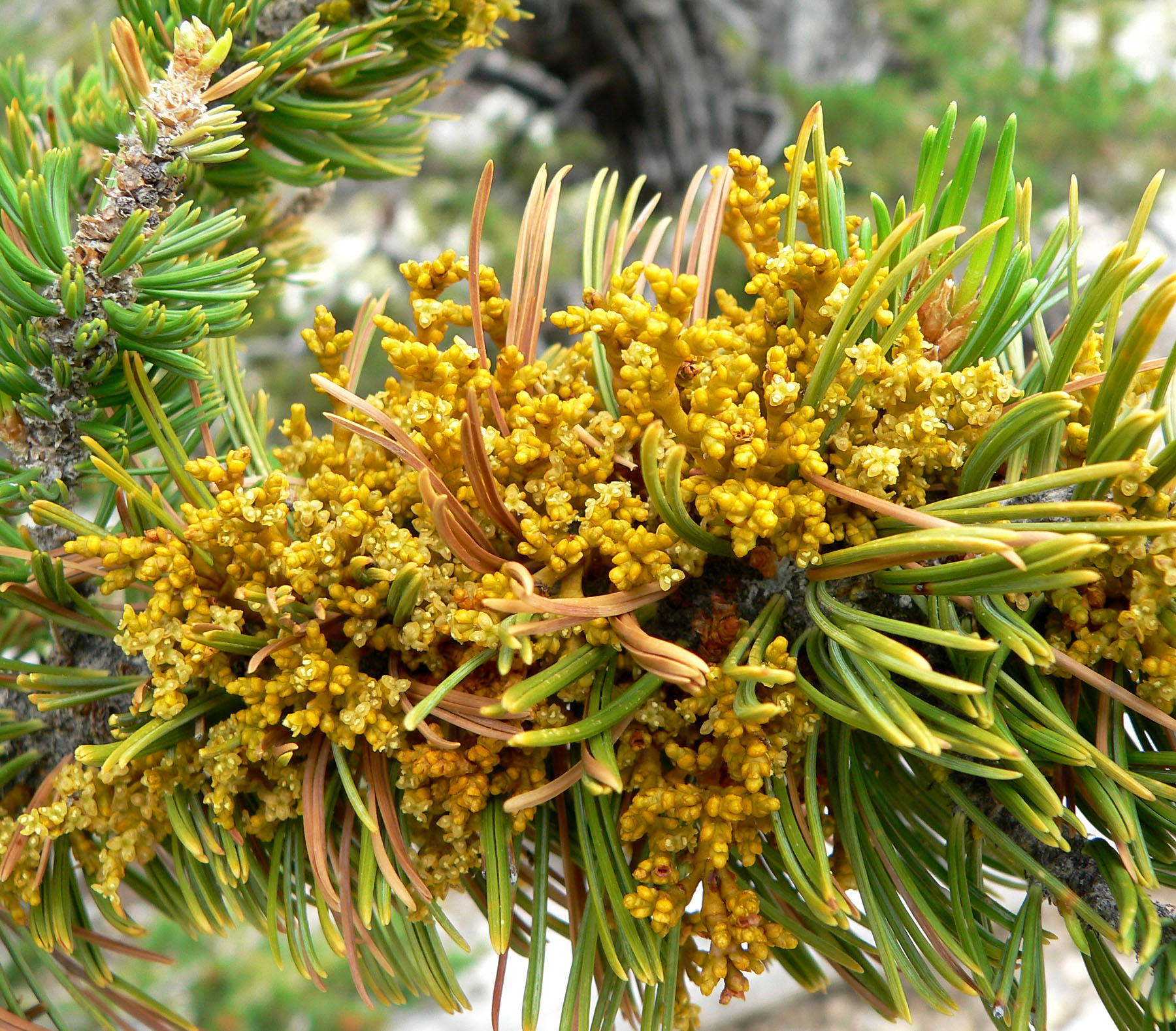
- Growing on Great Basin bristlecone pine

Scientific classification
- Kingdom: Plantae
- Clade: Tracheophytes
- Clade: Angiosperms
- Clade: Eudicots
- Order: Santalales
- Family: Santalaceae
- Genus: Arceuthobium
- Species: A. cyanocarpum

Binomial name
- Arceuthobium cyanocarpum (A.Nelson ex Rydb.) J.M.Coult. & A.Nelson

Synonyms
- Arceuthobium campylopodum subsp. cyanocarpum; Arceuthobium campylopodum f. cyanocarpum; Razoumofskya cyanocarpa

= Arceuthobium cyanocarpum =

Plant species in the sandalwood family

Arceuthobium cyanocarpum, commonly known as limber pine dwarf mistletoe, is a species of parasitic plant in the sandalwood family, Santalaceae, sometimes instead placed in the viscaceous mistletoe family, Viscaceae. It is native to the western United States, where it grows at high elevations in the Rocky Mountains and Great Basin and, less commonly, in Oregon and California. There, it grows on and parasitizes conifers, primarily the limber pine (Pinus flexilis), whitebark pine (P. albicaulis), Rocky Mountain bristlecone pine (P. aristata), and Great Basin bristlecone pine (P. longaeva). The plant significantly impacts the health and vigor of its host, sometimes resulting in mortality, but also contributes to other species and to the normal functioning of forest ecology. It is very similar in appearance to other closely related dwarf mistletoe species from western North America and it is not always recognized as a distinct species by botanists.

== Description ==
The visible portion of the limber pine dwarf mistletoe is densely packed slender shoots that emerge from witches' brooms, usually on pines with five needles. Unlike the brooms produced by other mistletoes, they tend to be small and dense. The shoots can be green, yellow-green, reddish, or even mostly purple with seed producing flowers and pollen producing flowers on separate shoots. Pollen producing stems tend to be more orange in color. The seed shoots are usually 3.6 centimeters (1.4 in) long, but ranging from 1.7 to 6.7 cm (0.7–2.6 in) in length with a diameter at the base of 1–9.5 millimeters. The length of the stem between the second and third node is 2.3–11.8 mm and its diameter is 1.1–2.3 mm. The pollen producing stems average 2.8 cm (1.1 in) and can be 0.8 to 6.3 cm (0.3–2.5 in) with a base of 0.8–6.3 mm. The third segment of the stem is 1.8–10.3 mm with a width of 0.9–2.2 mm. The stems can be unbranched or branch from the base and the pollen producing stems have four distinct sides when dried. The leaves of this species, as with all of its genus, are reduced to small scales that are fused to the stems on opposite sides in pairs.

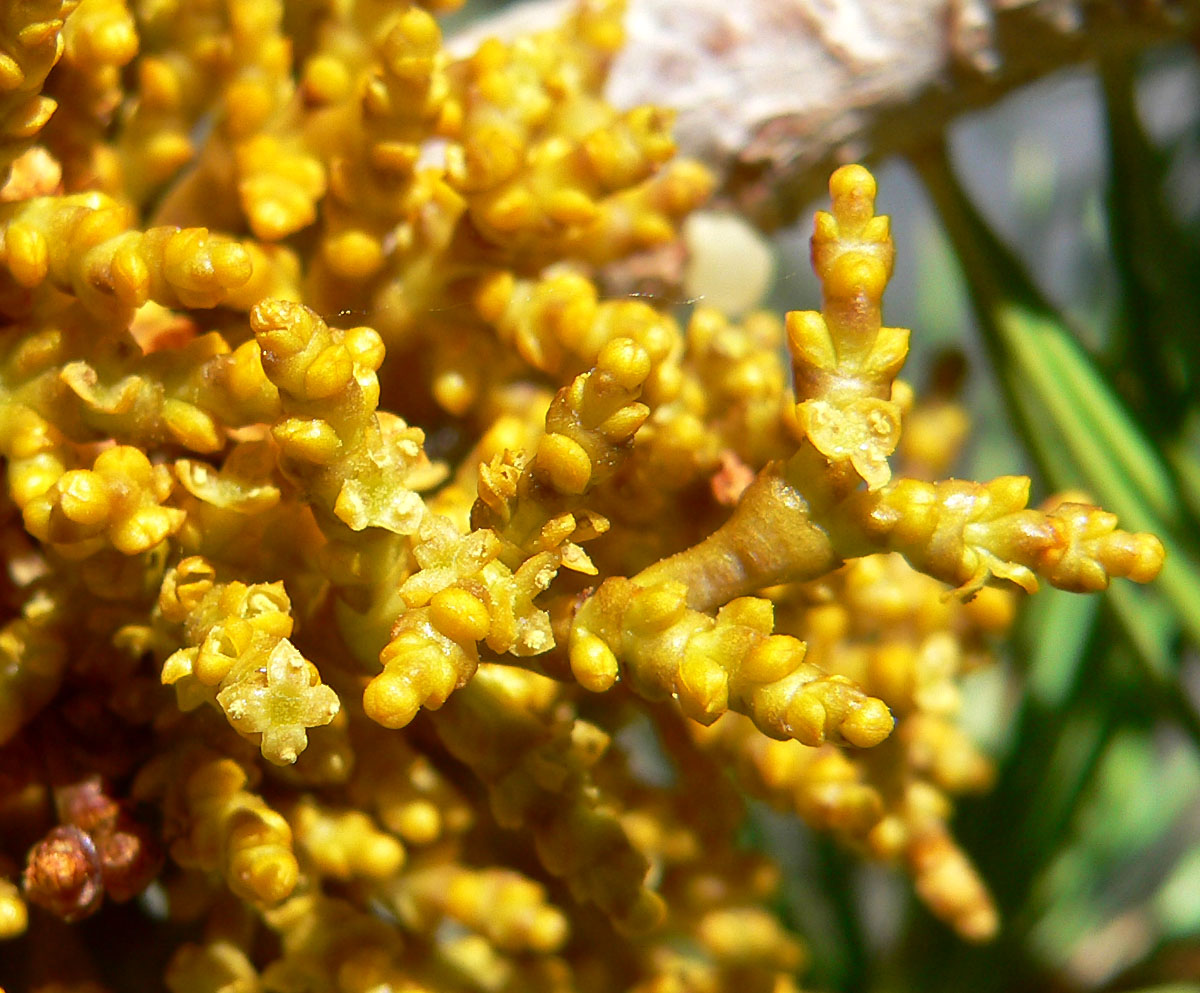
Pollen producing flowers on shoots emerging from Pinus flexilis, Spring Mountains, southern Nevada

Flowering can occur during the period from early July to the middle of September. The pollen producing flowers are lentil shaped when budding. Opening they have typically have three petals, occasionally four, with a diameter of 1.8–3.8 mm. The pollen flowers produce nectar from a single nectary. The berries have a light brown tip and are blue-glaucous due to a covering of natural waxes, though less so than western white pine dwarf mistletoe (Arceuthobium monticola). They are 2.5–4.5 mm long and 1.7–3.2 mm wide with seeds that are 1.3–2.5 mm. The interior of the fruit is sticky and, as with all the dwarf mistletoes, launched explosively at an initial velocity of 21 m/s (69 ft/s) from the parent plant when ripe.

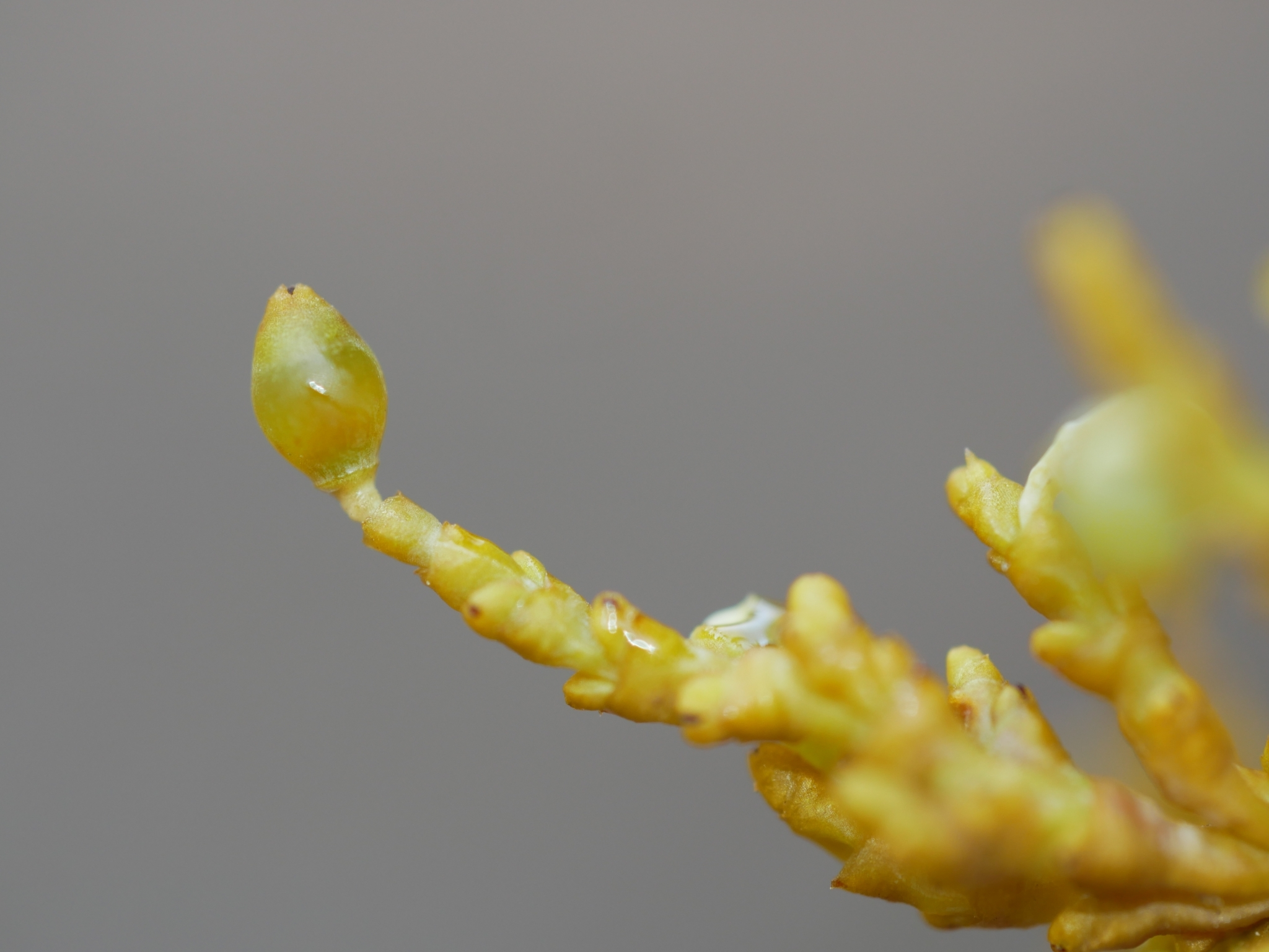
Fruit at end of stem

After infection by a seed, it will take two to three years for shoots to emerge from the host and a further year or more before flowering begins.

== Taxonomy ==
In 1906 the botanist Per Axel Rydberg described a species in the genus Razoumofskya that he named Razoumofskya cyanocarpa, crediting Aven Nelson. It was moved to Arceuthobium in 1909 by John Merle Coulter and Nelson. The type specimen for the species was collected by Nelson from tree in the Ferris Mountain within Carbon County, Wyoming. Although Arceuthobium cyanocarpum is the accepted name according to Plants of the World Online and the Natural Resources Conservation Service, it is considered a subspecies of Arceuthobium campylopodum by the author of its treatment in Flora of North America.

Table of Synonyms
Name	Year	Rank
Arceuthobium campylopodum subsp. cyanocarpum (A.Nelson ex Rydb.) Nickrent	2012	subspecies
Arceuthobium campylopodum f. cyanocarpum (A.Nelson ex Rydb.) L.S.Gill	1935	form
Razoumofskya cyanocarpa A.Nelson ex Rydb.	1906	species

Both its appearance and genetics show that Arceuthobium apachecum is the most closely related species to A. cyanocarpum. Together they are grouped with three other species of dwarf mistletoe, Arceuthobium blumeri (Blumer’s dwarf mistletoe), Arceuthobium californicum (sugar pine dwarf mistletoe), and Arceuthobium monticola (western white pine dwarf mistletoe) that primarily infect white pines. A total of 13 species make up section Campylopoda.

=== Names ===
Arceuthobium cyanocarpum is known by the common name limber pine dwarf mistletoe.

== Distribution ==
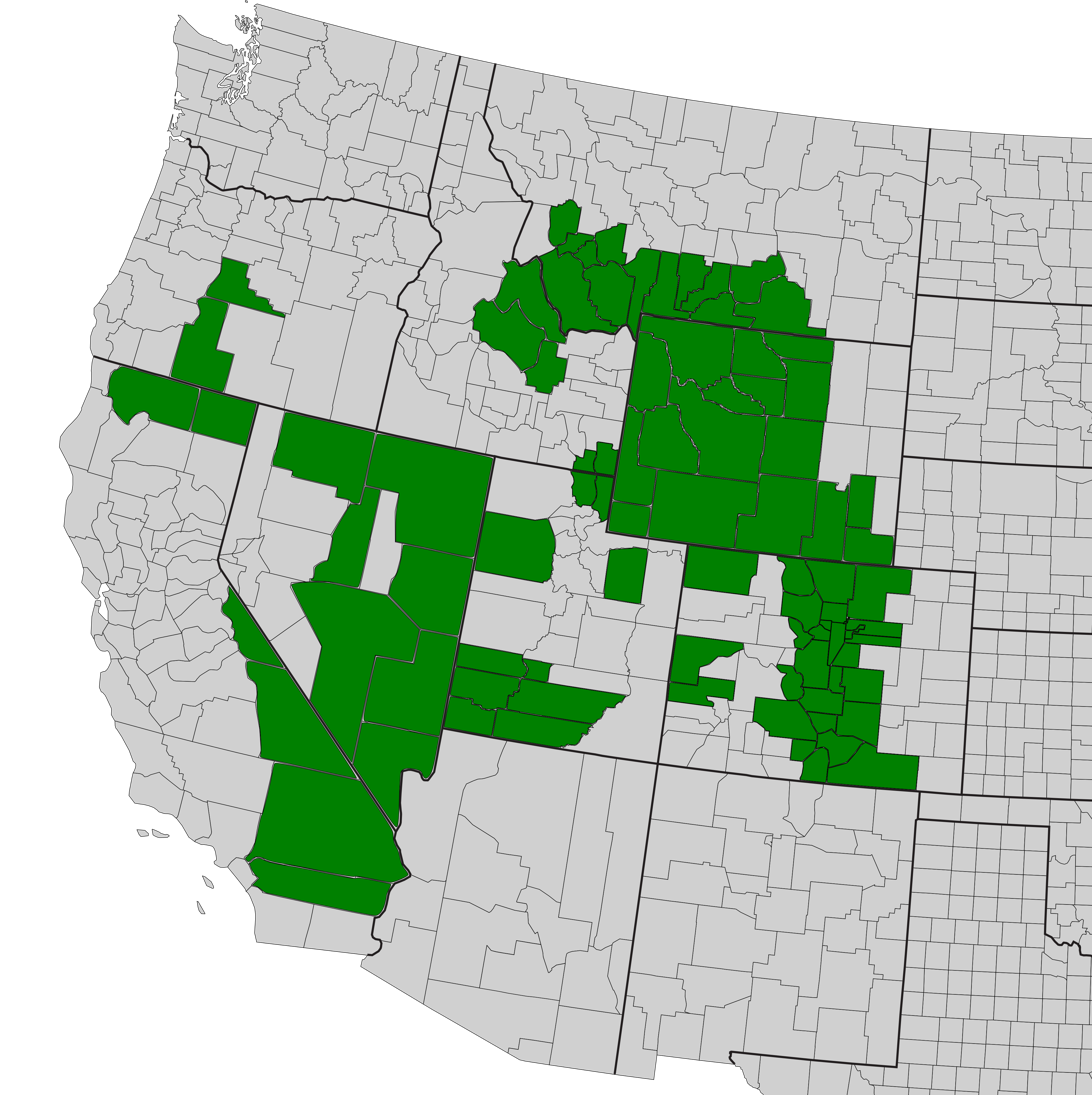
a map of counties where Arceuthobium cyanocarpum occurs, shaded in green

The native range of Arceuthobium cyanocarpum extends across much of western North America. Like its hosts, it is primarily a montane species, occurring at elevations of 1,600–3,100 m (5,249.3–10,170.6 ft). It is broadly distributed across Wyoming southward through the Front Range in Colorado, but populations are otherwise scattered across mountain ranges in Montana, Idaho, Utah, Nevada, Oregon, and California. A. cyanocarpum is a common species in the Great Basin and the Rocky Mountains in the western United States, but is rather uncommon in Oregon and California. In Oregon, it is known from the Three Sisters Wilderness, Newberry National Volcanic Monument, and Crater Lake National Park. In northern California, it grows in the Warner Mountains and near Mount Shasta in the north and the San Bernardino and San Jacinto mountains as well as desert ranges to the east in southern California.

The fragmented populations of A. cyanocarpum scattered across the west are likely relicts of a much broader distribution from a time when host trees occurred at lower elevations. For example, limber pine (Pinus flexilis) and Great Basin bristlecone pine (P. longaeva) once grew at elevations 800–1,000 m (2,624.7–3,280.8 ft) lower in Nevada than they do today and have become confined to isolated mountain ranges as the climate warmed. Fossils of A. cyanocarpum were discovered in pack rat middens from southern Nevada and the Grand Canyon dating from 15,000 to 22,000 years ago. The Grand Canyon site lies 190 km (118.1 mi) to the south of the nearest extant populations, and A. cyanocarpum no longer occurs there due to a change in the conifer diversity.

== Ecology ==
=== Parasitism and effects on host plants ===
Although it is most common on the limber pine (Pinus flexilis), three other pine species in the subgenus Strobus are classified as principal hosts, meaning that they are infected at a rate of at least 90% where infestations occur: whitebark pine (P. albicaulis), Rocky Mountain bristlecone pine (P. aristata), and Great Basin bristlecone pine (P. longaeva). On Mount Shasta, Mount Eddy, and the rim of Crater Lake, it also infects western white pine (P. monticola), which is classified as a secondary host. Occasionally, other conifers are cross-infected, including foxtail pine (Pinus balfouriana) near Mount Eddy, sugar pine (Pinus lambertiana) in the San Jacinto Mountains, and more rarely mountain hemlock (Tsuga mertensiana) in Central Oregon, Rocky Mountain ponderosa pine (P. ponderosa subsp. scopulorum) and lodgepole pine (P. contorta subsp. latifolia) in the Rocky Mountains. Reports of the mistletoe on Engelmann spruce (Picea engelmannii) are unconfirmed, and its susceptibility to A. cyanocarpum remains unknown.

In greenhouse studies, eastern white pine (Pinus strobus) and southwestern white pine (Pinus strobiformis, sensu lato) seedlings were successfully inoculated with A. cyanocarpum, although neither pine grows within the mistletoe's native range.

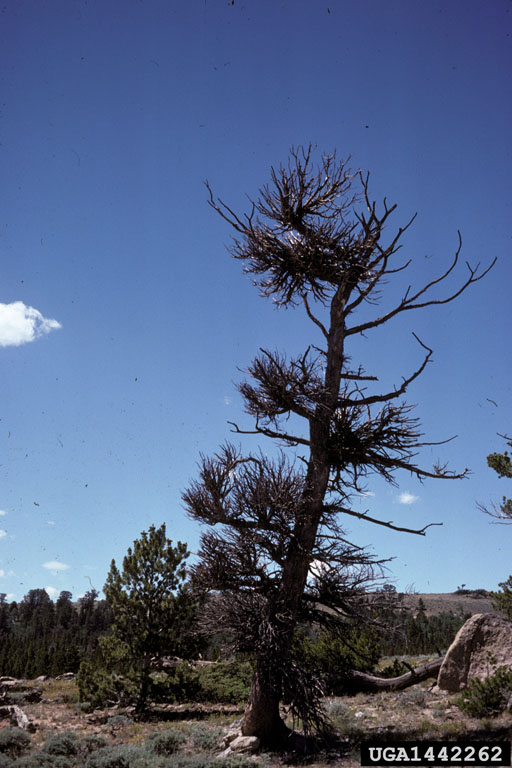
A dead limber pine in the Shoshone National Forest with extensive broom formation induced by Arceuthobium cyanocarpum

The most conspicuous effect that infection by dwarf mistletoe has on its a host tree is the formation of abnormal growths called witch's brooms. These brooms are composed of tangled masses of twigs and branches, usually with reduced cone formation, and swellings at the points of infection. In trees infected by A. cyanocarpum, these brooms are usually compact and visible from a distance, but in some heavily-infected trees, the brooms may be few or so densely arranged that they are indistinct. Brooms act as resource sinks, drawing the host's water and nutrients closer to the mistletoe at the expense of uninfected branches. Moreover, the cracking of bark around witch's brooms increases the host tree's susceptibility to infection by pathogens and bark beetles.

Infection by dwarf mistletoes negatively impacts the health and vigor of the host tree, largely by changing its growth form, diverting water toward brooms, and expropriating water and nutrients. Brooms transpire at high rates, causing the host to lose significant amounts of water; trees infected by dwarf mistletoes have mortality rates four times higher than uninfected trees during periods of drought. Infected trees also produce fewer cones, so their reproductive rate is lowered. The longevity of host trees is reduced, but death typically occurs over the course of many decades.

Limber pine (P. flexilis) and whitebark pine (P. albicaulis) infected by A. cyanocarpum have high mortality rates when compared to other conifers infected by dwarf mistletoes. Especially high mortality rates have been noted for P. flexilis in the Rocky Mountains and P. albicaulis on the north slopes of Mount Shasta. Areas where large numbers of pines have died as a result of infection by A. cyanocarpum are often referred to as "ghost forests".

=== Associations with other species ===
While little is known about dwarf mistletoe pollination in general, many invertebrates have been identified as pollinators of Arceuthobium cyanocarpum. A study of a Colorado population found that the chalcid wasp Copidosoma bakeri was the single most important insect pollinator and also noted the importance of the fly family Anthomyiidae and genus Phora and the soft-winged flower beetle genus Hoppingiana. Other pollinators include thrips (probably in the genus Sericothrips) and ants in the genus Formica, although ants are less important to the pollination of A. cyanocarpum than to other dwarf mistletoe taxa. Spiders from at least six families have also been collected on A. cyanocarpum, with hunting spiders proposed as possible pollination vectors and web weaving spiders, whose webs trap pollen, considered possible barriers to pollination.

Dwarf mistletoe shoots are an important food source for animals, including birds, small mammals, and insects. Moreover, American red squirrels prefer to eat the bark of pine branches infected with A. cyanocarpum, which may contain more sugar and lipids than uninfected branches. The plant bug Neoborella tumida and the larvae of the thicket hairstreak, Callophrys spinetorum, both feed exclusively on dwarf mistletoes, including A. cyanocarpum. Both species mimic the color of mistletoe shoots, providing camouflage, which is enhanced for Callophrys spinetorum larvae by their knobby texture.

In Idaho, mourning doves and mountain bluebirds have been observed feeding on A. cyanocarpum. Birds also act as an important dispersal vector for the mistletoe in the Rocky Mountains where it sometimes occurs on isolated host trees and cannot spread by seed ejection. Witch's brooms induced by dwarf mistletoe infections form important nesting habitat for a diversity of bird species, though nests have not been reported near brooms induced by A. cyanocarpum specifically.

The hyperparasitic fungus Septogloeum gillii (formerly called Cylindrocarpon gillii) infects A. cyanocarpum and most other species of dwarf mistletoes in the western United States. The fungus causes yellow or white lesions on the mistletoe shoots that erupt into masses of white spores, killing the shoots.

== Conservation ==
Because of its negative impacts on host trees, there have been some attempts to control some populations of A. cyanocarpum. For example, 6,000 infected limber pines were removed from Craters of the Moon National Monument and Preserve in the 1960s in an unsuccessful attempt to eliminate the population of mistletoe there. Similarly, A. cyanocarpum was successfully inoculated with the fungal pathogen Septogloeum gillii in at least one experiment, though the fungus has never been introduced successfully as a biological control agent. More recently, dwarf mistletoes have been recognized as an important factor in the dynamics of conifer forest ecosystems, and their eradication is no longer an objective of forest management.

The conservation organization NatureServe evaluated the taxon, listed as a subspecies of Arceuthobium campylopodum, in 1994. They report it to be a apparently secure subspecies at the global level (T4) but consider it vulnerable (S3) in Wyoming and Colorado and imperiled (S2) in Nevada.
