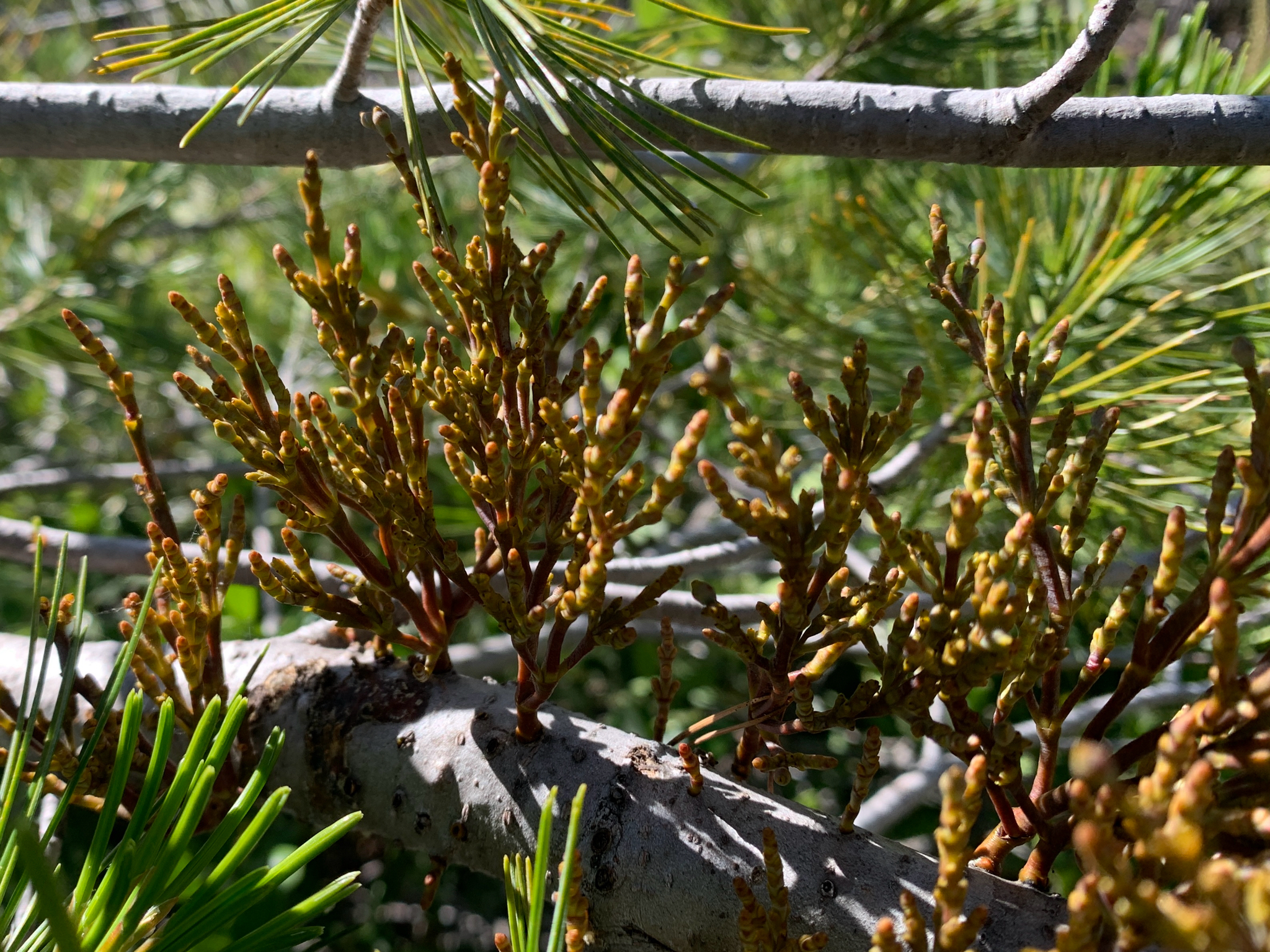

Scientific classification
- Kingdom: Plantae
- Clade: Tracheophytes
- Clade: Angiosperms
- Clade: Eudicots
- Order: Santalales
- Family: Santalaceae
- Genus: Arceuthobium
- Species: A. monticola

Binomial name
- Arceuthobium monticola Hawksw., Wiens & Nickrent

Synonyms
- Arceuthobium campylopodum subsp. monticola (Hawksw., Wiens & Nickrent) Nickrent

= Arceuthobium monticola =

Species of dwarf mistletoe

Arceuthobium monticola is a species of dwarf mistletoe known as western white pine dwarf mistletoe. It is a small shrub that grows on and parasitizes a small number of conifer species, primarily western white pines (Pinus monticola). It is endemic to the Klamath Mountains of northern California and southern Oregon, which has been identified as a major center of dwarf mistletoe biodiversity. This species impacts the ecology of coniferous forests significantly, negatively affecting the health of host trees but also creating valuable microhabitats for wildlife by inducing witch's brooms.

== Description ==
As a parasite, A. monticola obtains water and most of its nutrients from a host tree on which it grows. For the first few years of its life, the mistletoe grows entirely within the host tree, developing a system of tissues called the haustoria that tap into the host's xylem and phloem. Thereafter, a network of flabellately-branched stems 5-10 cm in length emerges from the host. These shoots are reddish-brown, greenish-yellow, or brown-colored and bear small, scale-like leaves. Although all species of dwarf mistletoe contain some chlorophyll, they produce low amounts of sugar through photosynthesis and primarily rely on their host for carbohydrates.

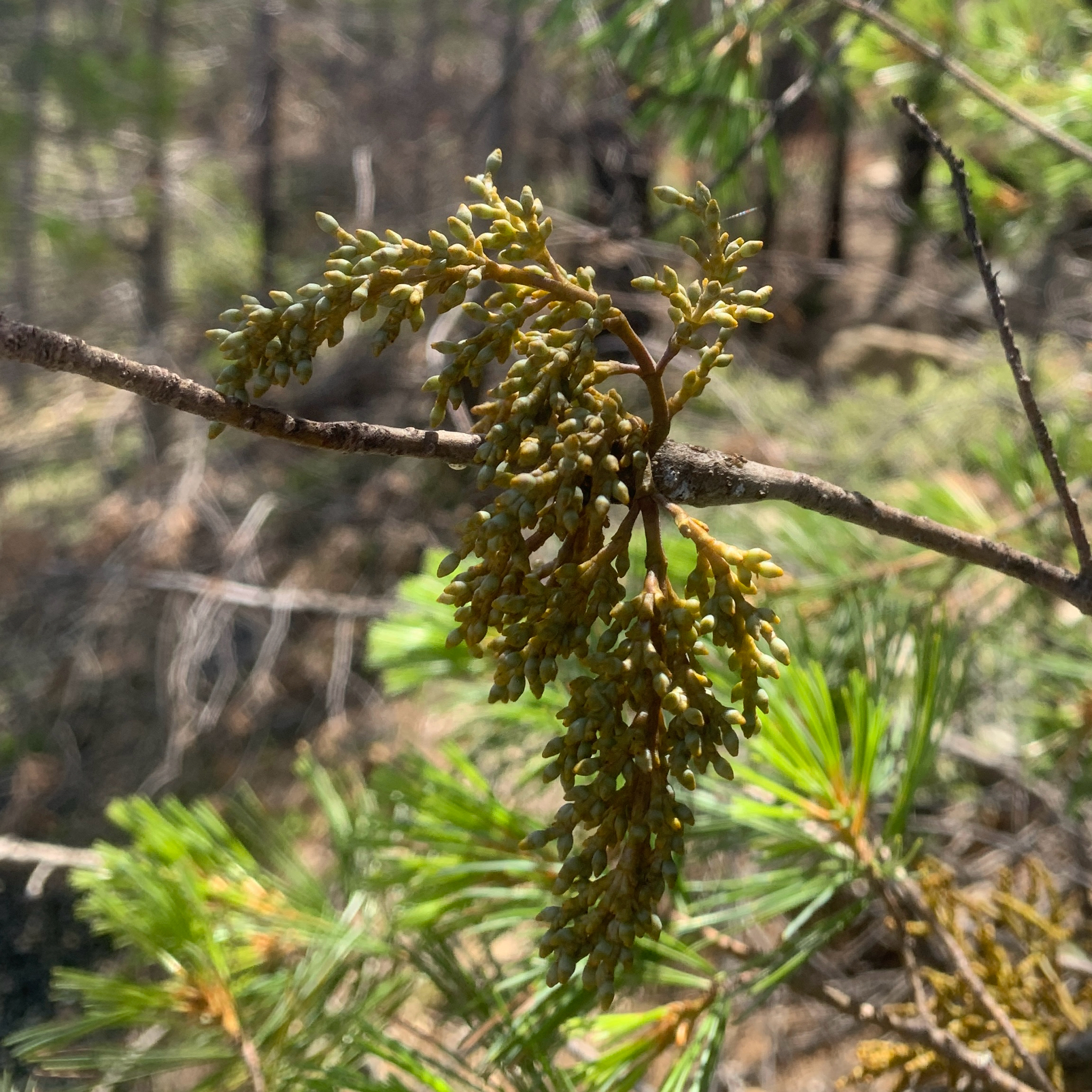
Female plants have with brownish stems and waxy, bluish fruit. Note swelling in the branch of the host tree at the point where the mistletoe attaches.

A. monticola is dioecious, meaning that plants produce either male (staminate) or female (pistillate) flowers. Male flowers are 3 mm in diameter and have 3 or sometimes 4 petals. Male flowers bloom from late July to early September, with peak anthesis in August. The fruit is a waxy-blue, ovoid berry 4 mm in length, maturing from late August to early October. Peak seed dispersal occurs in September, when hydrostatic pressure builds up in the fruit until it explodes, propelling the seed at an initial velocity of nearly 27 m/s (89 ft/s). Seeds are covered in a sticky substance called viscin that helps them adhere to their target. Only one to two percent of seeds successfully germinate and infect a new host plant.

Like most dwarf mistletoe species, A. monticola specializes on a few hosts; as an aid to identification, it is often helpful to observe what proportion of each species of conifer at a site are infected by dwarf mistletoe. The principal host of A. monticola is the Western white pine (Pinus monticola), but it also parasitizes Brewer's spruce (Picea breweri) and occasionally sugar pine (Pinus lambertiana). In a site where A. monticola is present, typically over 90 percent of Western white pines are infected.

Other species of dwarf mistletoe specialize on various white pines but can be distinguished from A. monticola by geography, host preference, and morphology. For example, Arceuthobium cyanocarpum also regularly infects Pinus monticola (as a secondary host), but it is not sympatric with A. monticola and differs in size, producing stems only about 3 cm in length. Similarly, Arceuthobium californicum infects Pinus lambertiana in the Klamath Mountains but differs from A. monticola in that it does not infect any other hosts, has yellowish- or greenish-colored stems, and has a more southerly distribution.

== Distribution ==
A. monticola is one of eleven dwarf mistletoe species occurring in the Klamath Mountains, which is a center of diversity for the genus. Moreover, A. monticola is one of three dwarf mistletoe taxa endemic to the region, the other two being Arceuthobium siskiyouense and Arceuthobium abietinum subsp. wiensii. The range of A. monticola is limited to the extreme southwest of Oregon in Curry, Coos, and Josephine counties and the extreme northwest of California in Del Norte and Siskiyou counties. It grows in coniferous forests where Pinus monticola is abundant, at elevations between 700 and 1900 meters.

The 2002 Biscuit Fire destroyed a significant amount of habitat and may have impacted its distribution. Despite its narrow range and threats from large wildfires, the conservation status of this species has not been assessed.

== Ecology ==
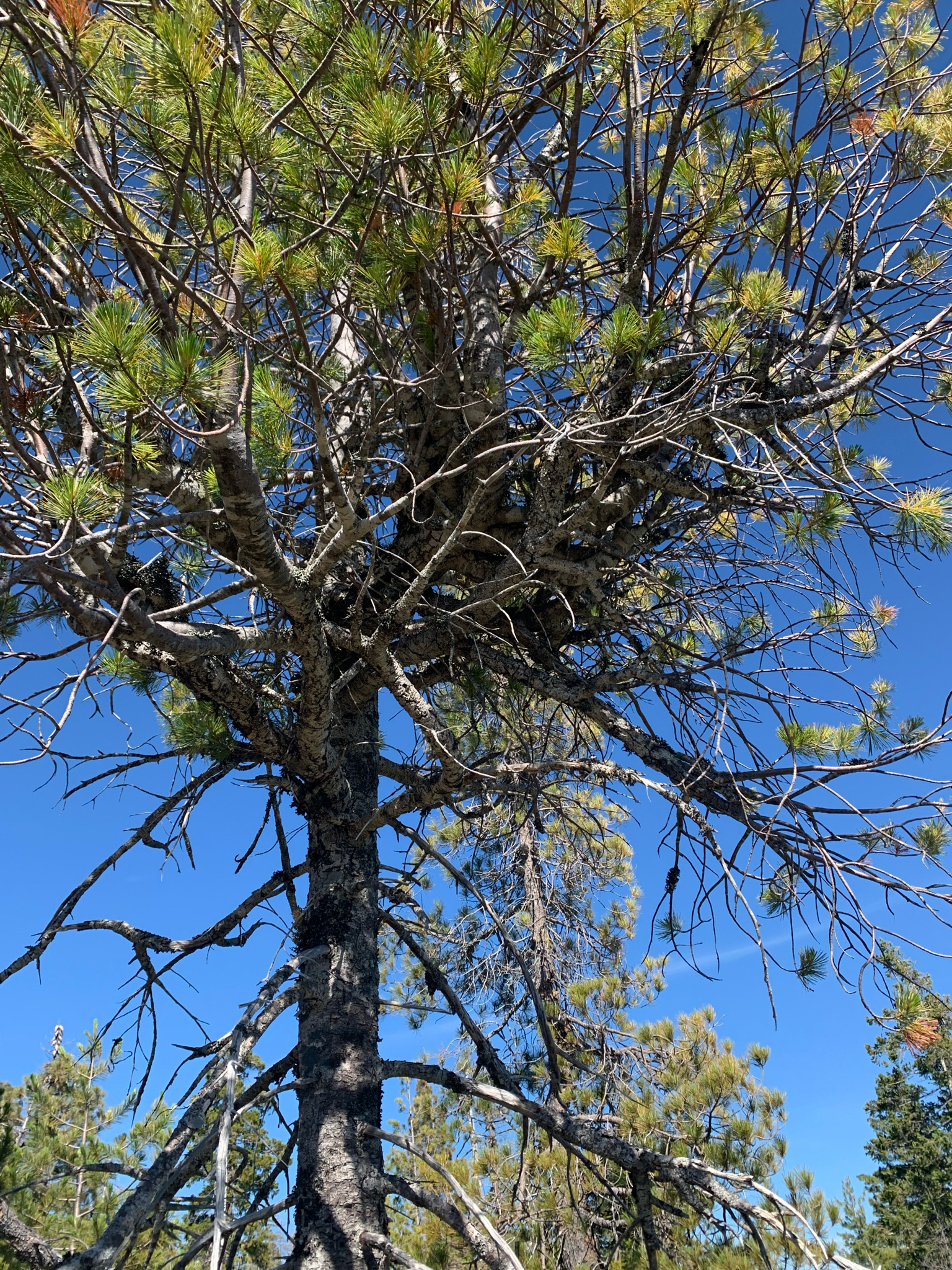
Broom formation on white pines infected by Arceuthobium monticola is common.

Infection by dwarf mistletoes such as A. monticola negatively affects the health of the host plant, reducing its longevity and rendering it more susceptible to co-infection by fungal pathogens. Abnormal growth, including the development of witch's brooms, is common on trees infected by A. monticola, further reducing the health of the host plant and rendering it more susceptible to fire. While broom formation negatively impacts the host tree, it also provides cover and nesting habitat for small mammals and birds.

Dwarf mistletoe plants are an important food source for arthropods, birds, and a range of mammals. While associations between A. monticola and other organisms have not been studied, some species of hairstreak butterflies specialize on mistletoes in the taxonomic group Campylopoda, to which A. monticola belongs.

== Taxonomy ==
The type specimen of A. monticola was collected by Delbert Wiens in 1987 near Oregon Mountain in Josephine County, Oregon. The epithet monticola refers to its primary host, Pinus monticola.

A. monticola belongs to a taxonomically difficult clade of dwarf mistletoes called Section Campylopoda, in which species boundaries are difficult to discern. In 1991, soon after the discovery of A. monticola, Daniel Nickrent used isozyme analysis to measure its genetic distinctiveness from other members of Campylopoda native to the Klamath Mountains, including A. californicum, A. siskiyouense, A. campylopodum, and A. littorum, finding significant enough differences in allele frequencies among the taxa to support A. monticola as separate species. In 1992, he together with Hawksworth and Wiens published the first valid description of the species. Later, in 2012, phylogenetic work comparing nuclear ribosomal ITS and chloroplast sequences of dwarf mistletoes showed little genetic differentiation between most members of Section Campylopoda, leading Nickrent to conclude that nearly all the taxa in this group should be treated as subspecies of a highly-variable species. On the other hand, morphometric studies demonstrating differences between A. monticola and other closely-related dwarf mistletoes have been used to support continued recognition of this species.

In light of the unclear status of taxa in Section Campylopoda, there is not a consensus among taxonomic authorities on how to treat A. monticola. Plants of the World Online and the Oregon Flora Project both consider A. monticola a distinct species. The Flora of North America treat the taxon instead at the subspecific level, with the name A. campylopodum subsp. monticola. In contrast, The Jepson Manual considers A. monticola a synonym of A. campylopodum, along with all other members of Section Campylopoda native to California.
