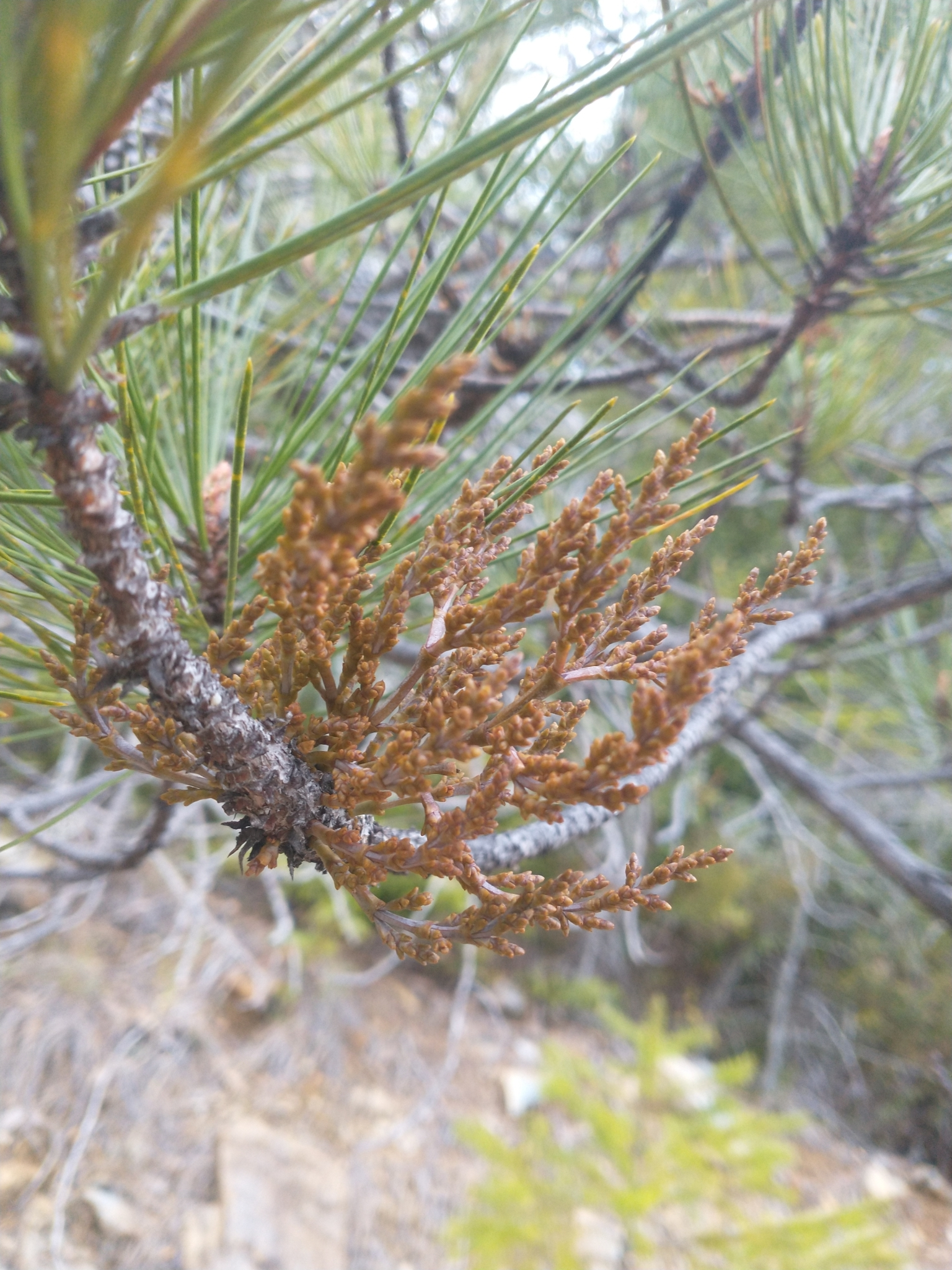

Scientific classification
- Kingdom: Plantae
- Clade: Embryophytes
- Clade: Tracheophytes
- Clade: Spermatophytes
- Clade: Angiosperms
- Clade: Eudicots
- Order: Santalales
- Family: Santalaceae
- Genus: Arceuthobium
- Species: A. siskiyouense

Binomial name
- Arceuthobium siskiyouense Hawksw., Wiens & Nickrent

Synonyms
- Arceuthobium campylopodum subsp. siskiyouense (Hawksw., Wiens & Nickrent) Nickrent

= Arceuthobium siskiyouense =

Species of flowering plant

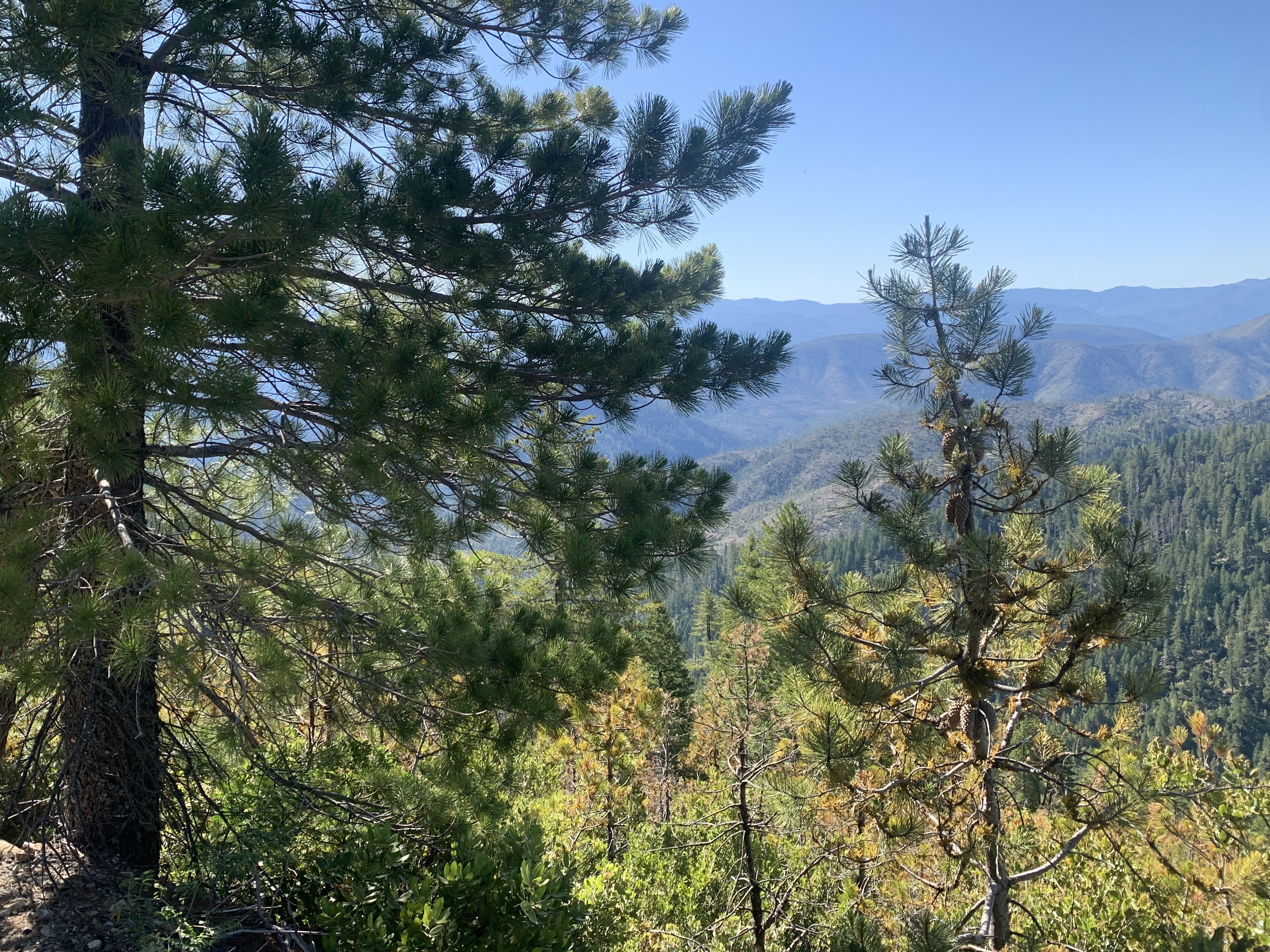
Host specificity of A. siskiyouense: a knobcone pine (right) is severely infected while a white pine (left) remains uninfected

Arceuthobium siskiyouense is a species of dwarf mistletoe commonly known as knobcone pine dwarf mistletoe and as Arceuthobium campylopodum subsp. siskiyouense. It is endemic to the Klamath Mountains of northern California and southern Oregon, where it parasitizes a number of species of hard pines in the subgenus Pinus. Its ecological impact on the coniferous forests where it is found is significant, both because of its negative impact on the health of infected trees and because it provides food and microhabitats (by inducing witch's brooms) for other wildlife.

== Description ==
As with other species of dwarf mistletoe, A. siskiyouense is a parasitic shrub that attaches to a host tree, from which it extracts water and nutrients. For the first few years of its life, the mistletoe develops an endophyte system inside a young branch of the host tree consisting of tissue called haustoria, which invade the host's xylem and phloem systems. Aerial stems eventually emerge from the bark of the host tree, and though these stems contain chlorophyll and can photosynthesize, A. siskiyouense obtains most of its sugar from the host plant. The stems of this species of mistletoe are reddish-brown or brownish, slender, 5-17 cm long, and bear reduced, scale-like leaves.

This species is dioecious, meaning that plants produce either male (staminate) or female (pistillate) flowers. The male flowers are 3- or 4-petaled and 3 mm in diameter. The fruit is an oblong berry that is approximately 5 mm long, typically light green, and slightly glaucous. Anthesis occurs between late July and early September, with peak flowering in late July; seed dispersal peaks in late October and extends to late November. As with other species of dwarf mistletoe, the fruit discharges its seed at an initial velocity of nearly 27 m/s (89 ft/s) after building up significant hydrostatic pressure. Seeds can be launched a distance of up to 10 meters. A sticky substance called viscin coats the seed and helps it adhere to the branches of a potential host.

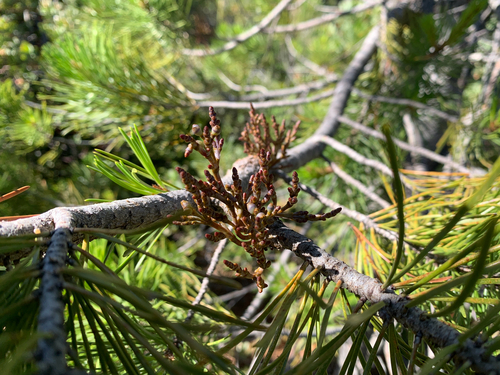
A. siskiyouense growing on the del Norte race of P. contorta in Josephine County, Oregon

Host affinity plays an important role in the identification of A. siskiyouense. Populations of this species typically infect very high proportions of knobcone pines (Pinus attenuata) and Jeffrey pines (Pinus jeffreyi), occasionally infect an undescribed subspecies of shore pine (Pinus contorta) in the Klamath range known as the del Norte race, and rarely infect ponderosa pines (Pinus ponderosa). Soft pines such as Western white pines (Pinus monticola) and sugar pines (Pinus lambertiana) are immune to A. siskiyouense. In contrast, populations of the closely related mistletoe species A. campylopodum and A. monticola infect over 90 percent of ponderosa pines and western white pines in an area, respectively.

Morphological differences between A. siskiyouense and other species of dwarf mistletoe, especially A. campylopodum are subtle and may represent a continuum. The most consistent identifying feature is plant color: plants in the species A. siskiyouense range from greenish-brown to reddish-brown whereas plants belonging to A. campylopodum are often yellowish (but may also be darker).

== Distribution ==
A. siskiyouense has one of the narrowest distributions in its genus, occurring only in the extreme northwest of California and the extreme southwest of Oregon. It is one of three dwarf mistletoe taxa endemic to the Klamath Mountains, the others being A. monticola and A. abietinum subsp. wiensii. The region has been identified as a center for dwarf mistletoe diversity, with 11 species present.

It grows in coniferous forests where knobcone and Jeffrey pines are abundant, at elevations between 400 and 1200 meters. A large population system can be found near Oregon Mountain on the border between Josephine County, Oregon and Del Norte County, California.

== Ecology ==
A. siskiyouense induces abnormal growth and swelling in its hosts; a high proportion of infected knobcone and Jeffrey pines produce witch's brooms, as do a more modest proportion of infected Pinus contorta. Abnormal growth in Jeffrey pines caused by mistletoe infection is often severe enough to result in the death of the host tree, perhaps compounded by the effects of the Jeffrey pine bark beetle, Dendroctonus jeffreyi. Moreover, brooms often break off and provide fuel for fires, making heavily-infected stands of pine more susceptible to wildfire.

While A. siskiyouense negatively impacts the health and longevity of its hosts, its creation of brooms provides valuable habitat for birds and small mammals. For example, several species of birds and small mammals have been documented using brooms induced by dwarf mistletoes as nesting sites or for cover; other species of birds, invertebrates, and mammals use dwarf mistletoes as a food source.

== Taxonomy ==
The type specimen of A. siskiyouense was collected by Delbert Wiens in 1987 near Oregon Mountain in Josephine County, Oregon. The epithet siskiyouense refers to the narrow geographic range of the species, centered around the Siskiyou Mountains.

A. siskiyouense belongs to a clade called Section Campylopoda, and boundaries between species in this group are poorly understood, possibly because the taxa are undergoing incipient speciation. Phylogenetic work comparing nuclear ribosomal ITS and chloroplast sequences has not demonstrated significant genetic differentiation between A. siskiyouense and most other members of Campylopoda. Morphometric studies have been used to support treating A. siskiyouense either as a distinct taxon or as a subspecies of A. campylopodum.

Because of the unclear status of this taxon, there is not a consensus among taxonomic authorities on how to treat A. siskiyouense. Plants of the World Online and the Oregon Flora Project consider A. siskiyouense a species, following a taxonomic framework advocated by Mathiasen and Kenaley. The Flora of North America recognizes this taxon instead at the subspecific level as A. campylopodum subsp. siskiyouense. In contrast, The Jepson Manual considers A. siskiyouense a synonym of A. campylopodum, along with almost all other members of Section Campylopoda.
