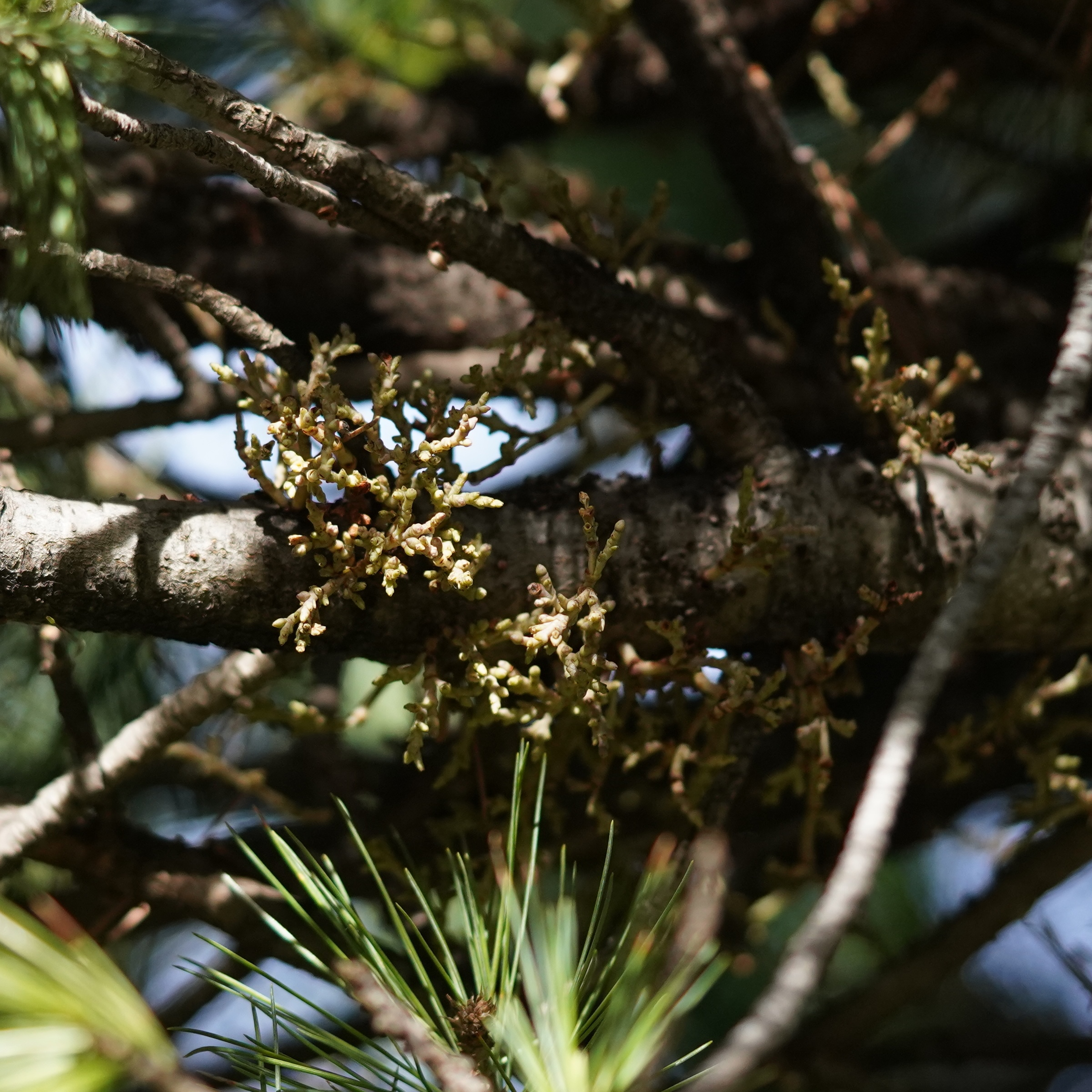

Scientific classification
- Kingdom: Plantae
- Clade: Tracheophytes
- Clade: Angiosperms
- Clade: Eudicots
- Order: Santalales
- Family: Santalaceae
- Genus: Arceuthobium
- Species: A. blumeri

Binomial name
- Arceuthobium blumeri A.Nelson

Synonyms
- Arceuthobium campylopodum subsp. blumeri (A.Nelson) Nickr.

= Arceuthobium blumeri =

Species of dwarf mistletoe

Arceuthobium blumeri, commonly known as Blumer's dwarf mistletoe or southwestern white pine dwarf mistletoe, is a species of dwarf mistletoe. It is a parasitic plant that grows as a small shrub on the branches and trunk of pine trees in the Section Strobus from southeastern Arizona to northern Mexico. In turn, A. blumeri is sometimes parasitized by fungi and provides food for animals, although little is known about its associations with other species. This species is ecologically important because of the negative impact of infection by A. blumeri on host trees and because the witch's brooms this species induces on its hosts are important microhabitats.

== Description ==
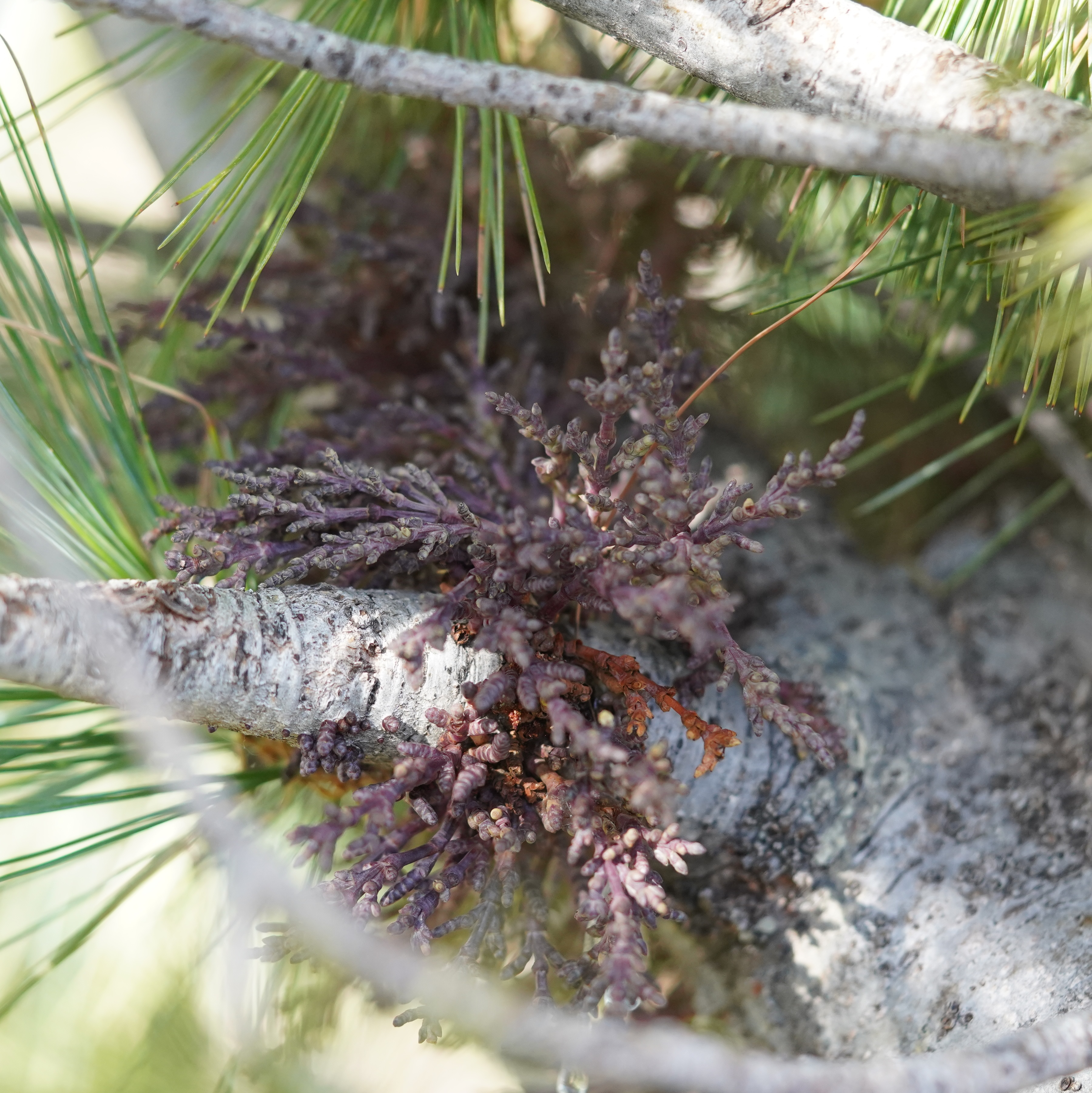
Unusually purple-colored shoots of Arceuthobium blumeri growing on southwestern white pine in the Huachuca Mountains

Arceuthobium blumeri is a parasite, like all other members of its genus. It gains most of its nutrients and all of its water by tapping into the xylem and phloem of a host tree via tissues called haustoria. For the first few years of the plant's life, it grows entirely within a young branch of the host tree, developing its endophytic system. Eventually, a network of gray-, straw-, or light-green-colored shoots approximately 10 cm long emerge from the host. In Arizona, the stems tend to be shorter, averaging 8 cm; in Durango, stems reach lengths up to 18 cm. The leaves of A. blumeri are minute and reduced to scales that clasp the stem.

Plants of A. blumeri are dioecious, meaning that each individual produces either staminate (male) or pistillate (female) flowers. Male flowers have 3, 4, or sometimes 5 or 6 petals, are 3-4 mm in diameter, and are notably darker-colored than the rest of the plant. Male flowers bloom in mid-summer, with peak anthesis occurring in early August. The fruit is a light green, ovoid berry with a slightly glaucous surface, 5 mm long, maturing in late summer to early fall, with peak seed dispersal in mid-September. As with other dwarf mistletoes, hydrostatic pressure builds up in the fruit until it discharges its seed at a velocity of up to 60 miles per hour. The seed is covered in a sticky substance called viscin which helps it adhere to its target.

The host range of A. blumeri is narrow, with only two documented host species. In the United States, it only infects Southwestern white pine; taxonomic authorities differ in their treatment of this species of pine in southern Arizona, which is called Pinus strobiformis or sometimes Pinus reflexa. In northern Mexico, it has also been documented on Mexican white pine (Pinus ayacahuite). Another species of dwarf mistletoe, Apache dwarf mistletoe (A. apachecum), also parasitizes southwestern white pines, but differs morphologically from A. blumeri and is not sympatric, meaning that its range does not overlap with that of A. blumeri.

== Distribution ==
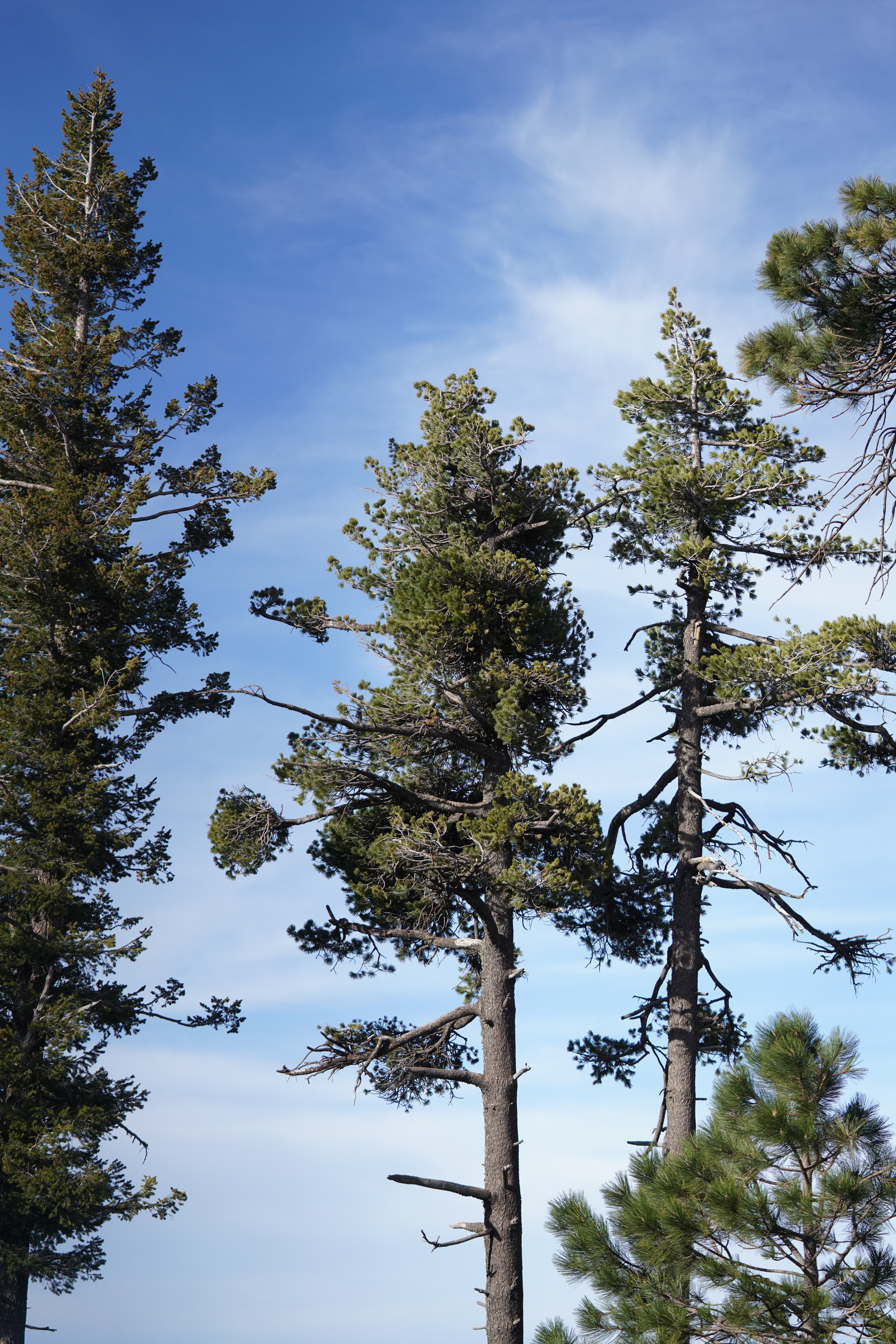
Southwestern white pines in the Huachuca Mountains of Arizona show signs of heavy infection by Arceuthobium blumeri, including dieback and the formation of witch's brooms.

This species is distributed widely through the Sierra Madre Occidental in Mexico, extending from the Huachuca Mountains of Cochise County, Arizona to southern Durango. There are also disjunct populations in Coahuila and on Cerro Potosí in the Sierra Madre Oriental. The elevational range of A. blumeri is 2100-3300 meters.

Populations of A. blumeri in the Huachuca Mountains have been impacted by wildfires, including the Monument Fire in 2011, significantly altering its distribution in Arizona.

== Ecology ==
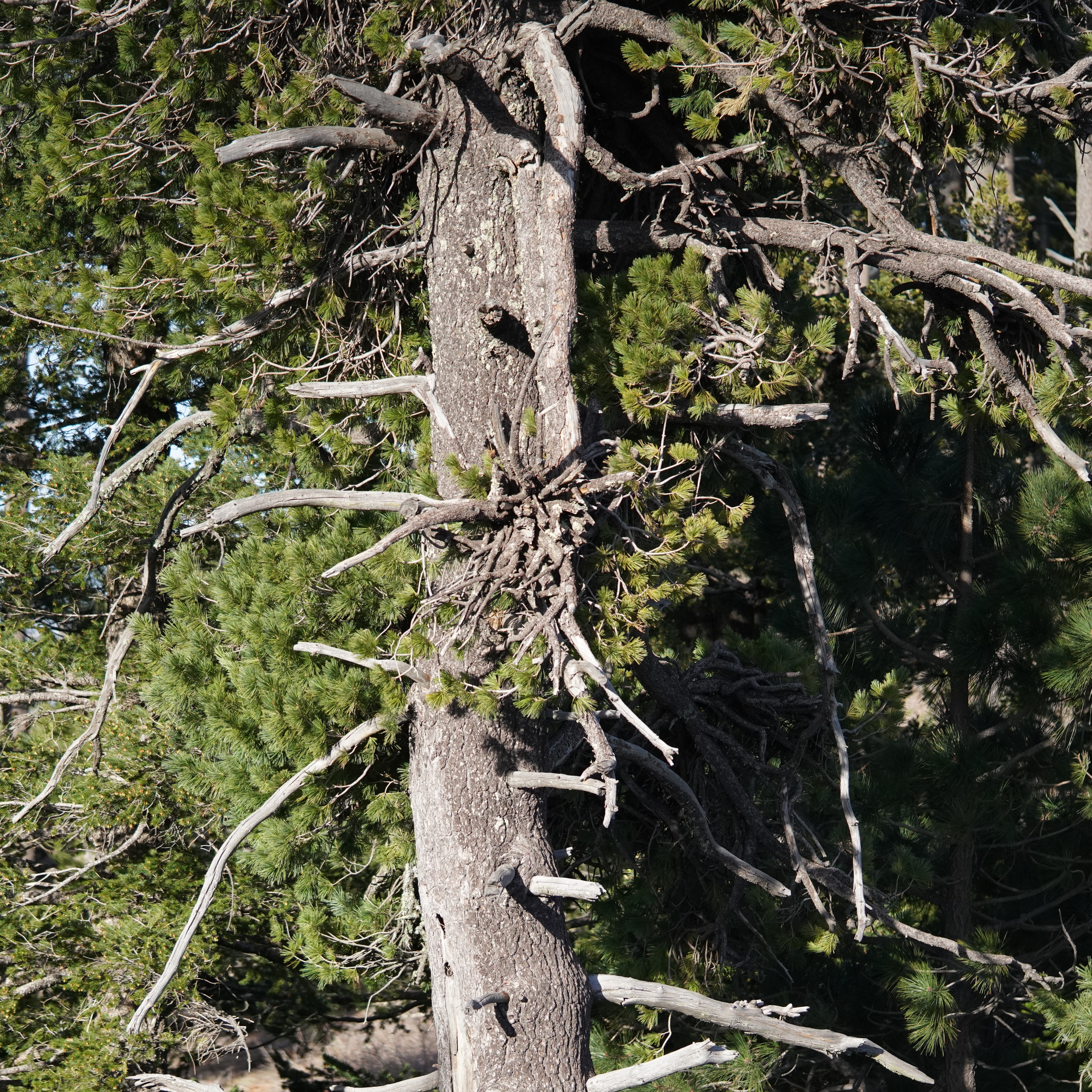
Arceuthobium blumeri induces the formation of knotted tangles of branches, called witch's brooms, on its host.

Infection by A. blumeri reduces the longevity and fecundity of its host trees, and stands of moderately- to heavily infected Southwestern white pines show mortality rates more than 20 times higher than uninfected trees. Contrary to early reports, A. blumeri frequently induces witch's brooms on infected trees at high elevations in the Huachuca Mountains. These brooms are irregularly-shaped and open. The formation of brooms is detrimental to the health of the host tree but also provides habitat for small mammals and birds.

Associations between A. blumeri and animals are poorly understood. For example, it is not known whether the species is insect-pollinated or wind-pollinated. However, the larvae of some thicket hairstreak butterflies (Callophrys spinetorum), which are specialists on dwarf mistletoes, have been documented feeding on A. blumeri.

The fungus Cylindrocarpon gillii has been reported as a hyperparasite on A. blumeri and on other species of dwarf mistletoe. Plants infected by this fungus develop yellowish-white lesions on both male and female shoots, erupting in white masses of spores. Thus, this fungus is a natural biocontrol agent of A. blumeri.

== Conservation ==
Arceuthobium blumeri is listed as a vulnerable species globally and in the United States. Though not listed under the Endangered Species Act of 1973, this species is classified as critically imperiled in Arizona by NatureServe, largely due to threats to Southwestern white pine, including by white pine blister rust, drought, and wildfires.

== Taxonomy ==
Arceuthobium blumeri was first described in 1913, based on collections from the Huachuca Mountains taken by Jacob Corwin Blumer in 1910. The species epithet blumeri honors the original collector, whose botanical expeditions in southern Arizona in the early 20th century produced 28 type specimens of newly described species.

This species belongs to Section Campylpoda, a clade of dwarf mistletoes with species boundaries that are difficult to discern. Taxonomic treatments of this group vary among authorities. Plants of the World Online recognizes A. blumeri at the species level, following the framework advocated by Mathiasen and Kenaley. Some authorities, including the Flora of North America, treat this taxon as A. campylopodum subsp. blumeri, following a framework advocated by Nickrent. Notably, a phylogenetic analysis of Section Campylopoda utilizing nuclear ribosomal ITS sequences and chloroplast sequences supported A. blumeri as the most divergent genetic lineage in Campylopoda. The results of this study indicate that A. blumeri forms a basal clade representing a transitional species between Sections Campylopoda and Vaginata.

Earlier studies questioned whether A. apachecum and A. blumeri are distinct, given that both species occur in southern Arizona and northern Mexico and specialize on Southwestern white pine. Cross-pollination studies failed to produce viable hybrid fruit, but the studies were inconclusive because control groups also yielded few viable fruit. Chemotaxonomic studies demonstrated chemical differences between A. blumeri and other species, including A. apachecum. Morphological studies have also been used to argue that A. blumeri is distinct from both of the other white pine specialists, A. apachecum and A. cyanocarpum.
