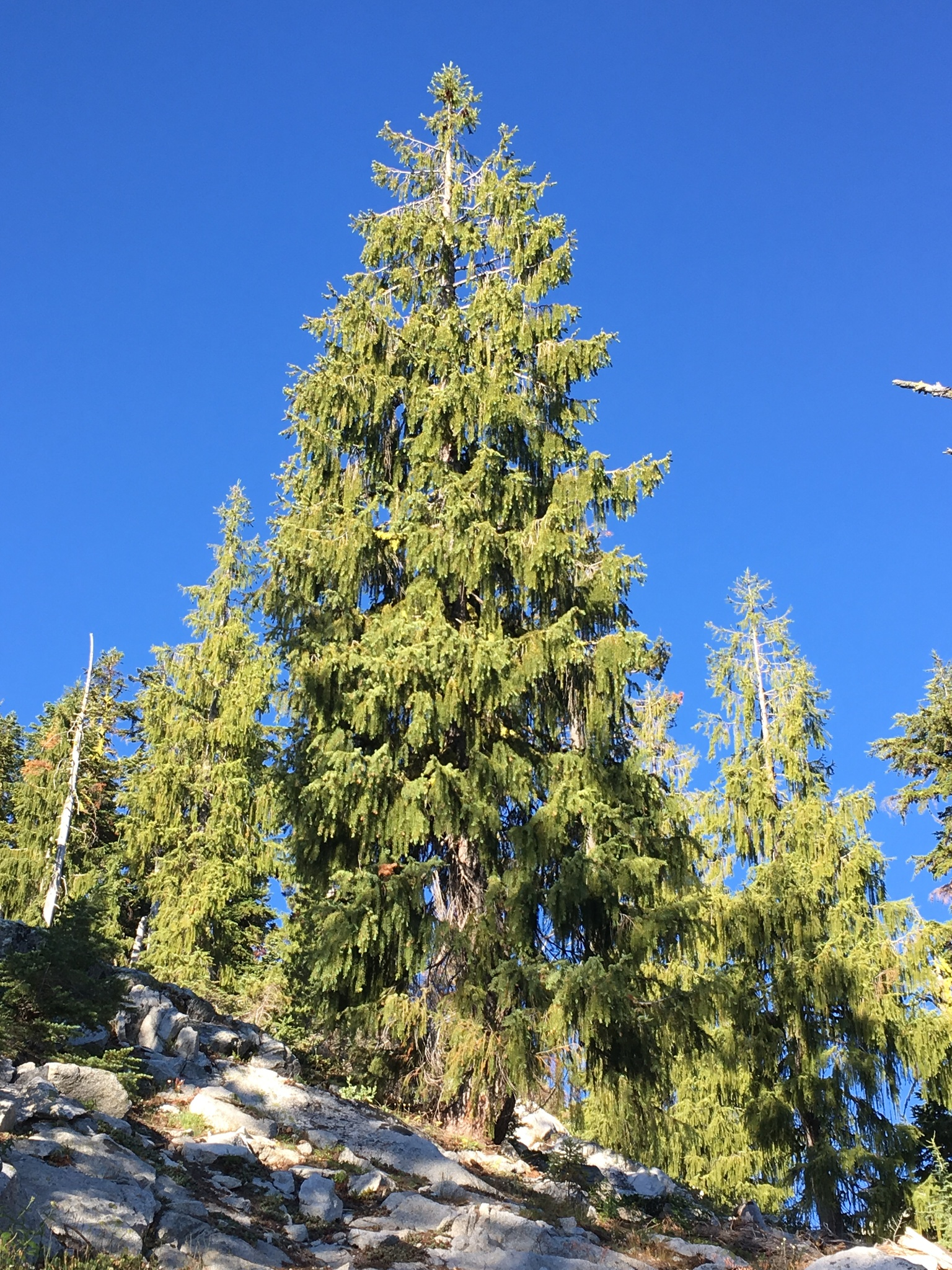
- Picea breweriana at Paynes Lake, Klamath NF, Siskiyou, California

Conservation status
- Vulnerable (IUCN 3.1)

Scientific classification
- Kingdom: Plantae
- Clade: Embryophytes
- Clade: Tracheophytes
- Clade: Spermatophytes
- Clade: Gymnosperms
- Division: Pinophyta
- Class: Pinopsida
- Order: Pinales
- Family: Pinaceae
- Genus: Picea
- Species: P. breweriana

Binomial name
- Picea breweriana S.Watson
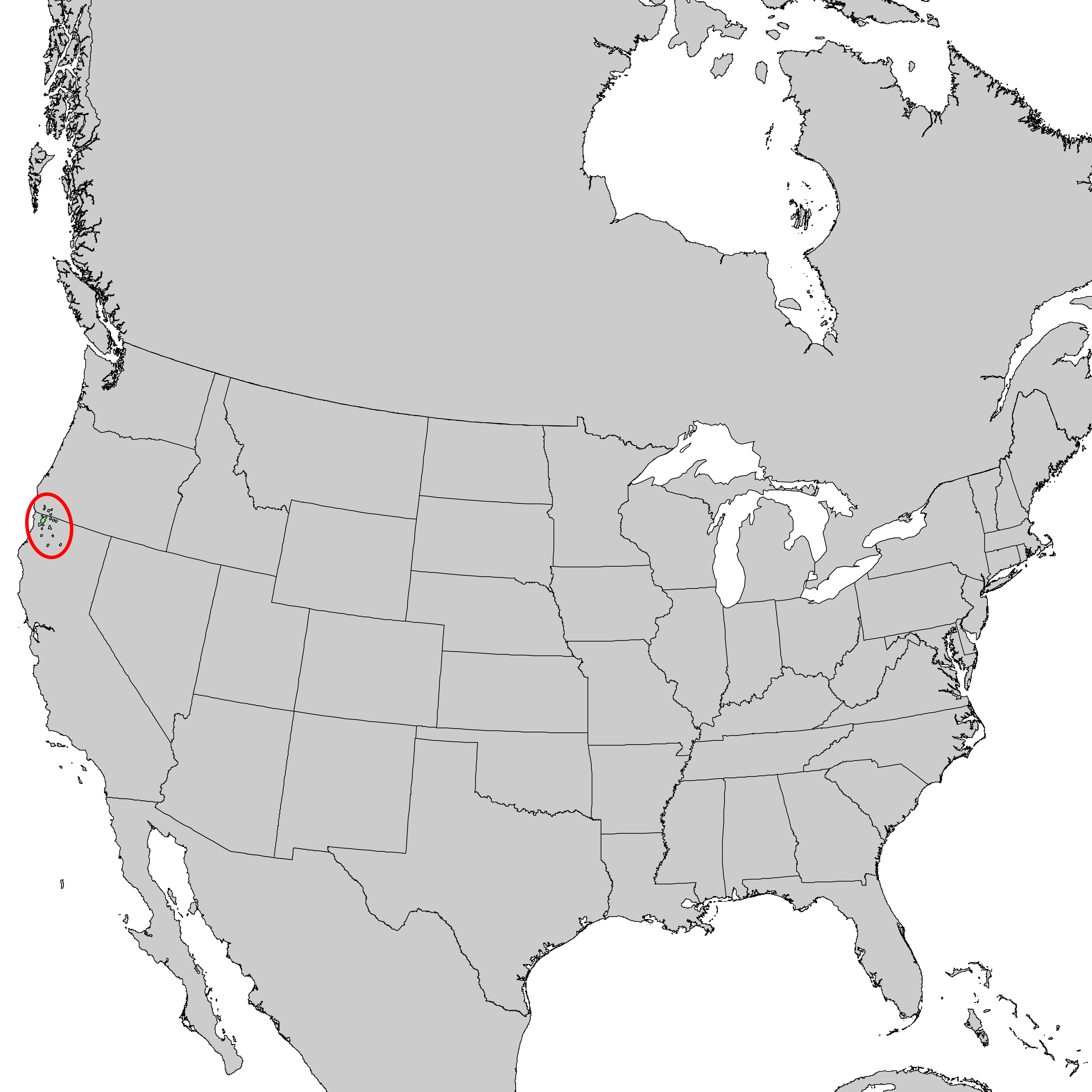
- Natural range of Picea breweriana
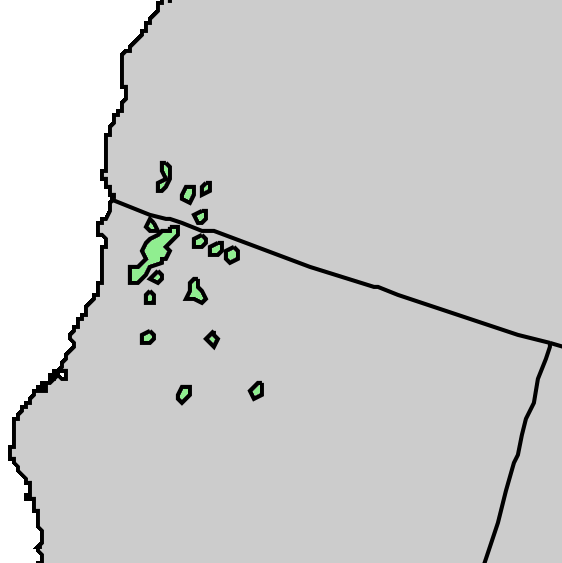
- Close-up of natural range of Picea breweriana

= Picea breweriana =

Species of conifer

Picea breweriana, known as Brewer's spruce, Brewer spruce, Brewer's weeping spruce, or weeping spruce, is a species of spruce native to western North America, where it is one of the rarest on the continent. The specific epithet breweriana is in honor of the American botanist William Henry Brewer.

== Description ==
Brewer's spruce is a large evergreen conifer growing to 20–40 meters (66–131 ft) tall, exceptionally 54 m, and with a trunk diameter of up to 1.5 m. The bark is thin and scaly, and purple-gray in color. The crown is very distinct, distinguished by level branches with vertically pendulous branchlets up to 1.2–2.4 m (4–8 ft), each branch forming a 'curtain' of foliage. The pendulous foliage only develops when the tree grows to about 1.5–2 m tall; young trees smaller than this (up to about 10–20 years old) are open-crowned with sparse, level branchlets. The shoots are orange-brown, with dense short pubescence about 0.2 millimeters long and very rough with pulvini 1–2 mm long.

The leaves are borne singly on the pulvini, and are needle-like but with a blunt tip, 15–35 mm long, flattened in cross-section, glossy dark green above, and with two bands of white stomata below.

The cones are longer than most other North American spruces, pendulous, cylindrical, 8–15 centimetres (3–6 in) long and 2 cm broad when closed, opening to 3–4 cm broad. They have smoothly rounded, thin, flexible scales 2 cm long. The immature cones are dark purple, maturing red-brown 5–7 months after pollination. The seeds are black, 3–4 mm long, with a slender, 12–18 mm long pale brown wing.

== Genetics ==
DNA analyses have shown that Picea breweriana has a basal position in the Picea clade, suggesting that Picea originated in North America.

== Ecology ==
Picea breweriana grows very slowly, typically less than 20 cm (8 in) per year. It occurs mainly on ridgetop sites with very heavy winter snow to provide a steady source of meltwater through the spring, but dry in the summer. It is very well adapted to cope with heavy snow and ice loads, with tough branches, and the drooping branchlets shedding snow readily.

Because of its slow growth, Brewer's spruce cannot compete with other much faster-growing trees like Douglas-fir. It is also susceptible to wildfire due to its thin bark and pendulous foliage, and therefore is seen to occur in exposed sites with poor, rocky soils, often at high elevation, where competition with other fire-sustaining conifers is reduced. It may also be found sporadically in open montane forests alongside conifer species adapted to similar conditions such as white fir, red fir, or mountain hemlock. The shrub species huckleberry oak and deer oak are other common associates.

The species is known to host several species of pathogens and parasites, including the root rot Heterobasidion annosum, the adelgid Adelges cooleyi, and the dwarf-mistletoe species Arceuthobium abietinum var. wiensii, Arceuthobium monticola, and Arceuthobium tsugense subsp. mertensianae.

== Distribution ==
It is endemic to the Klamath Mountains of southwest Oregon and northwest California, and grows at moderately high altitudes, from 1,000–2,700 m (3,300–8,900 ft) above sea level.

== Cultivation ==
Outside its native range, P. breweriana is a highly-valued ornamental tree in gardens, particularly in Great Britain and Scandinavia, where it is appreciated for its dramatically pendulous foliage. This plant has gained the Royal Horticultural Society's Award of Garden Merit.

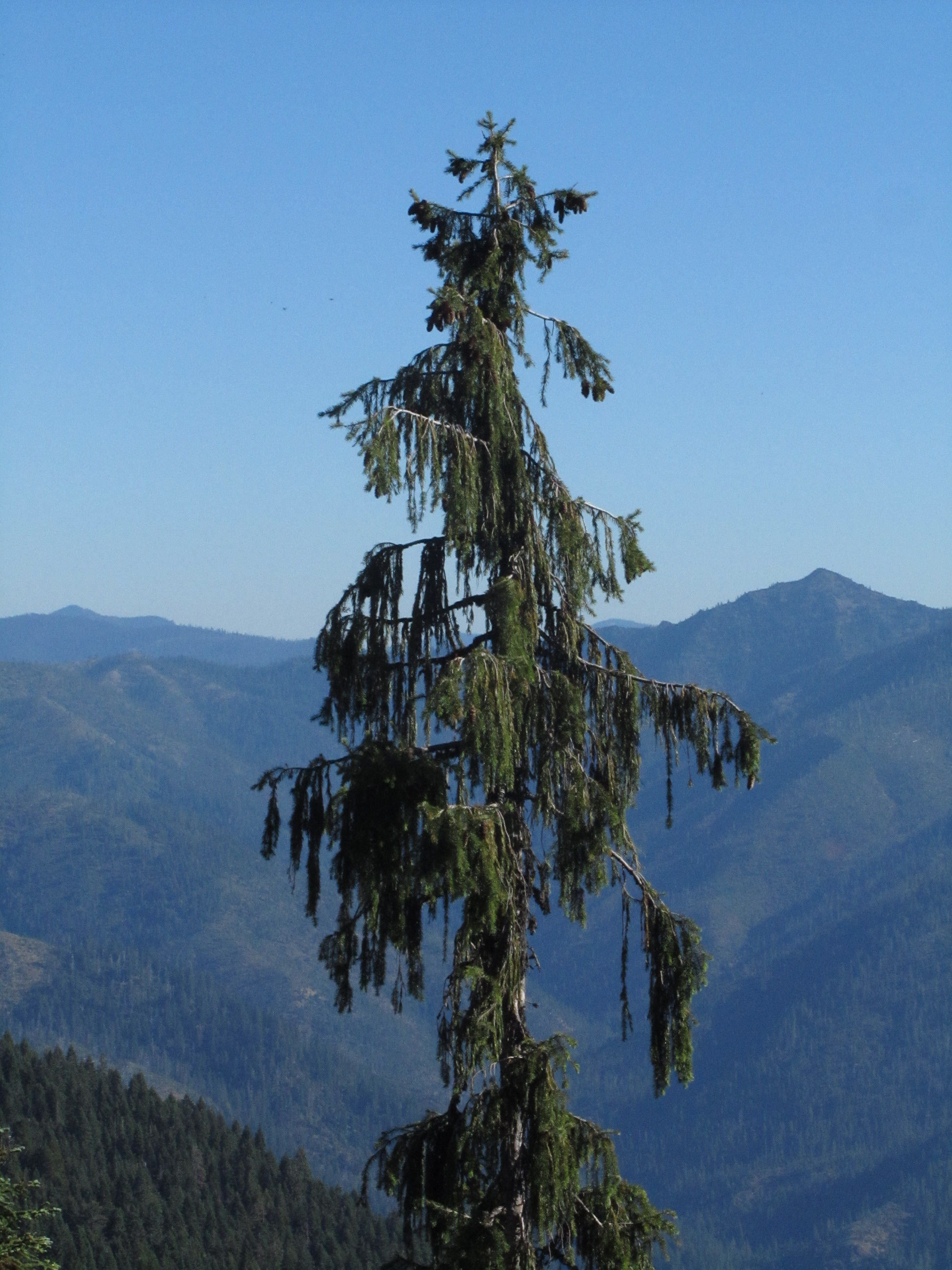
On a ridge above Bear Lake, Siskiyou Mountains, Ca.

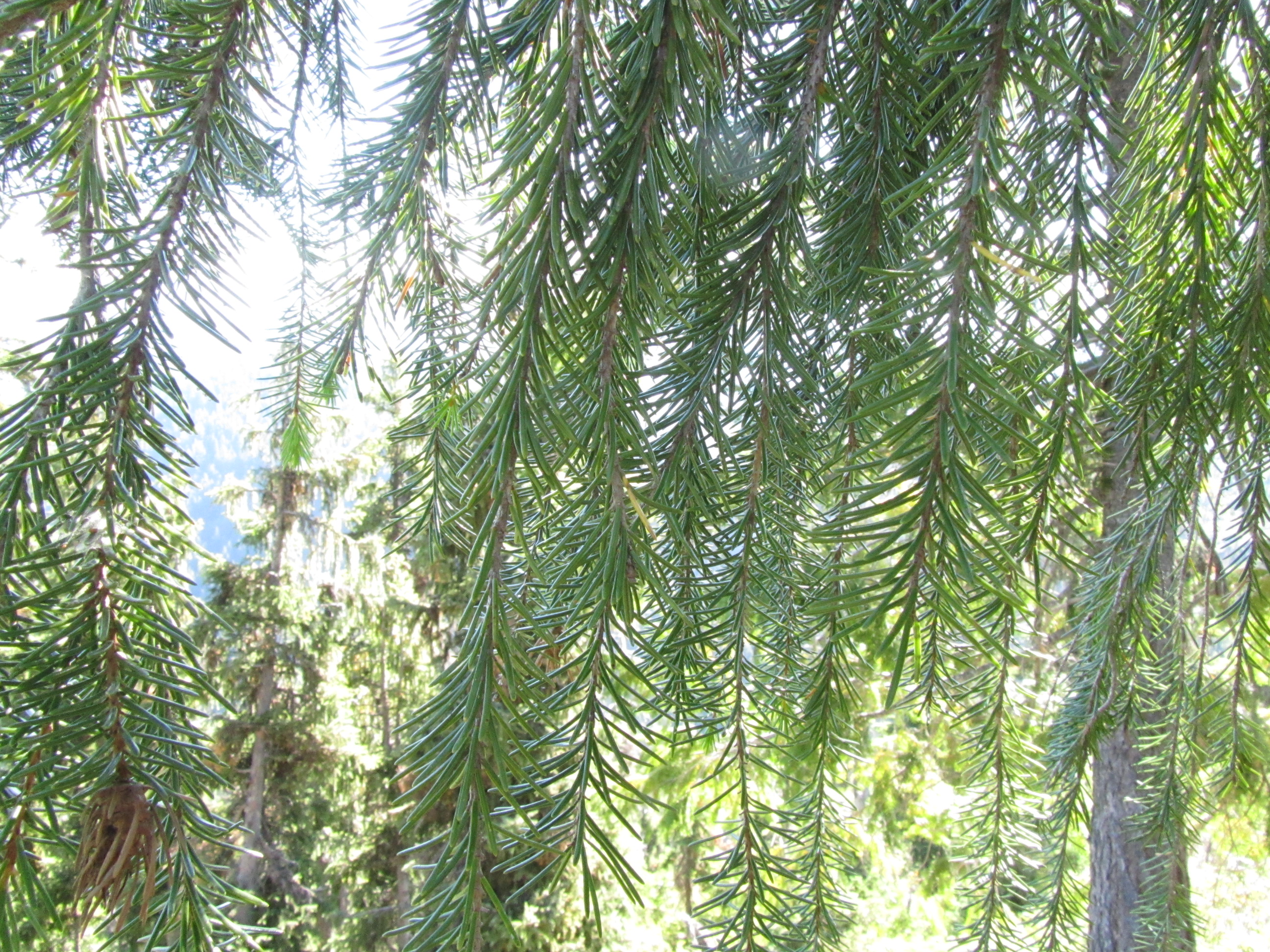
Foliage of a young tree, ridge above Bear Lake, Ca.

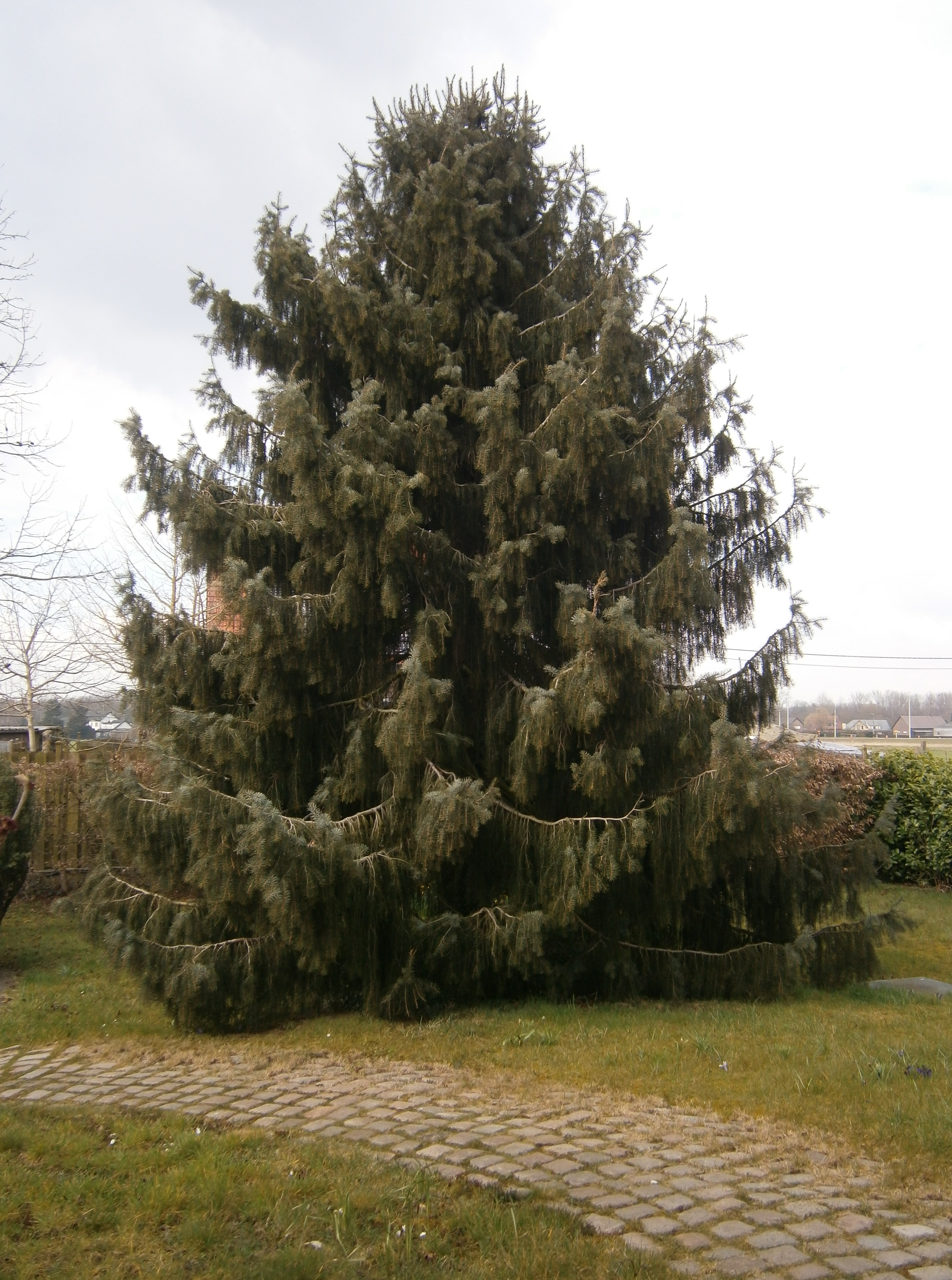
Picea breweriana in a garden

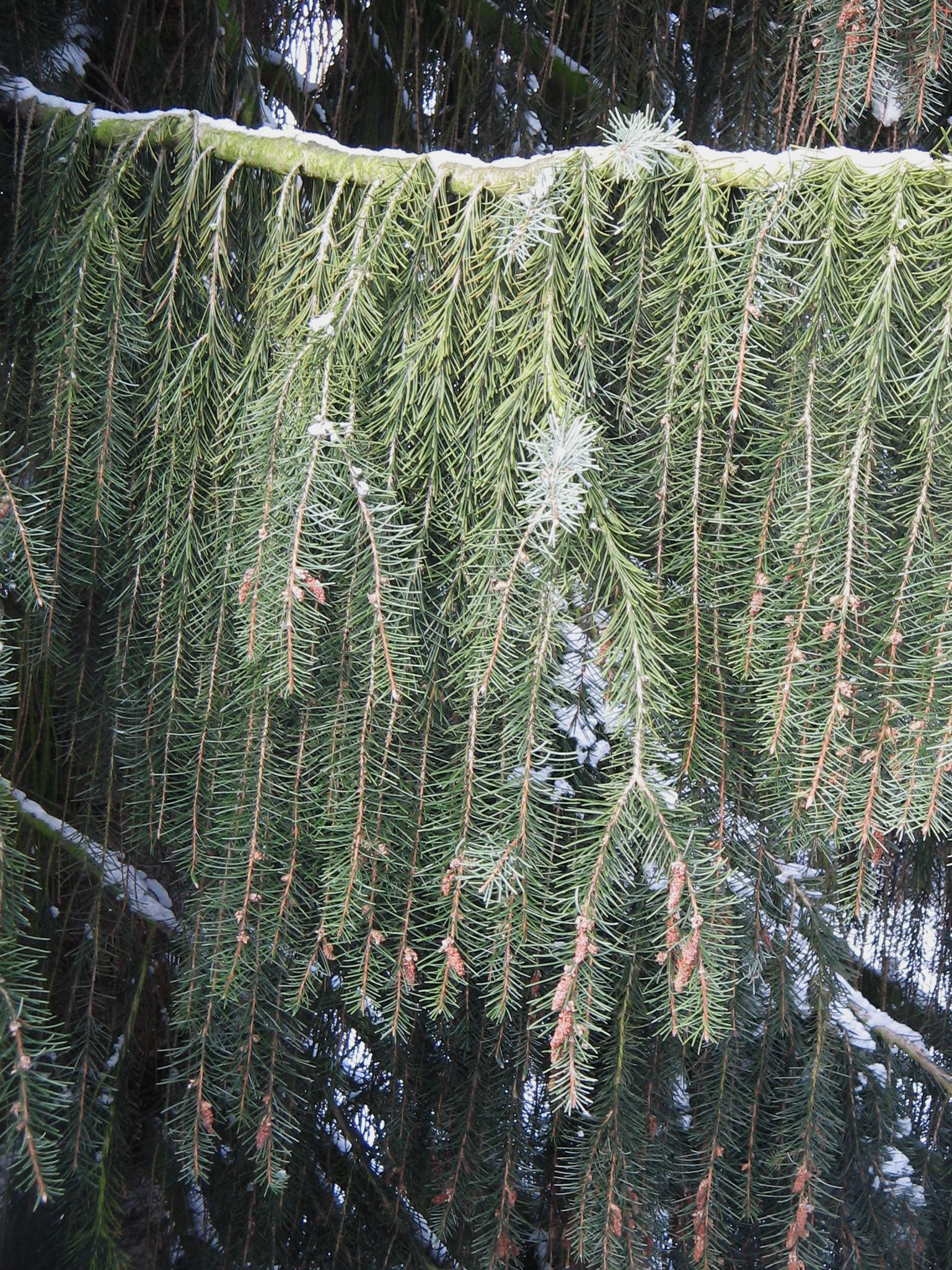
The weeping twigs

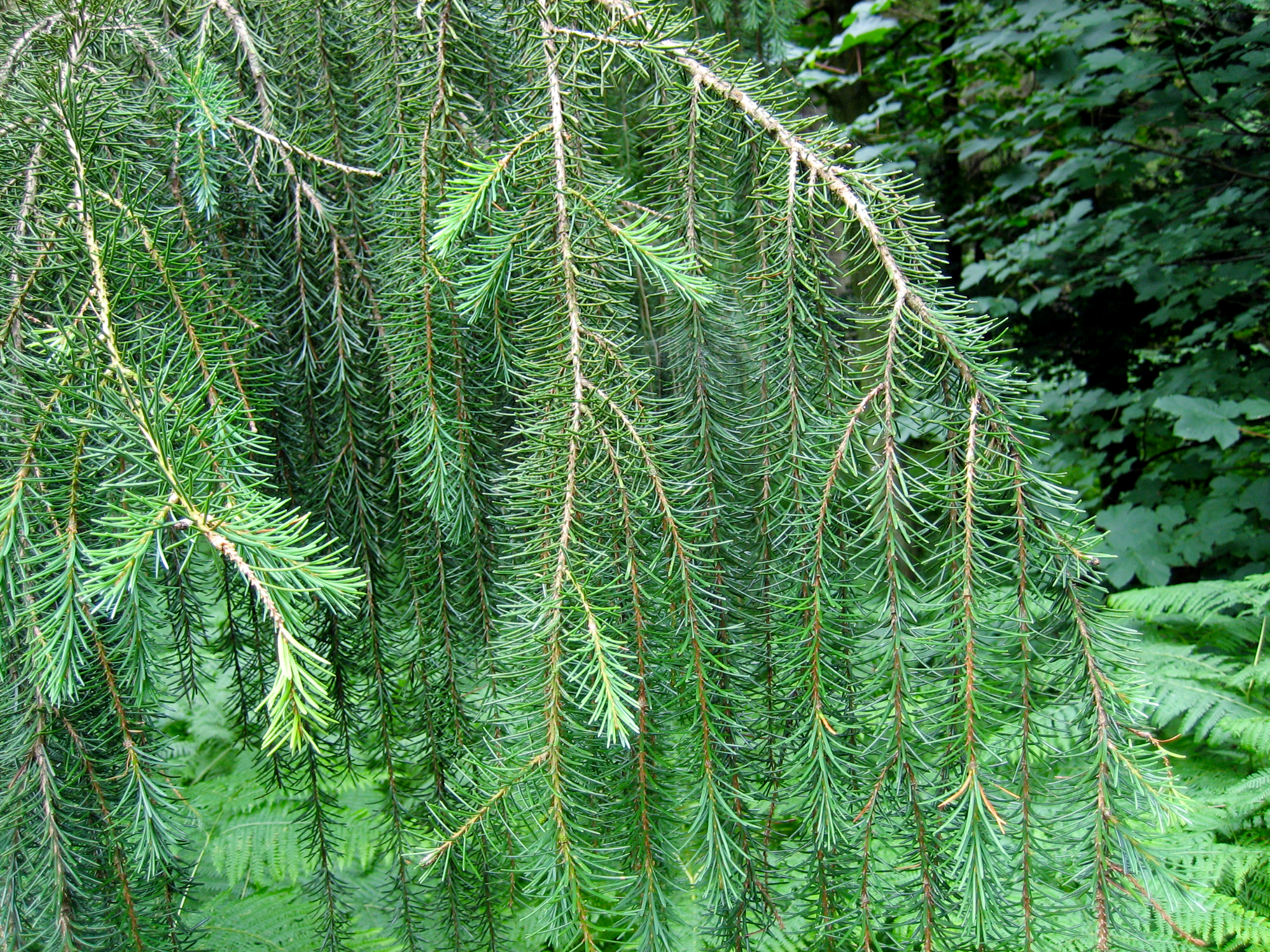
Foliage

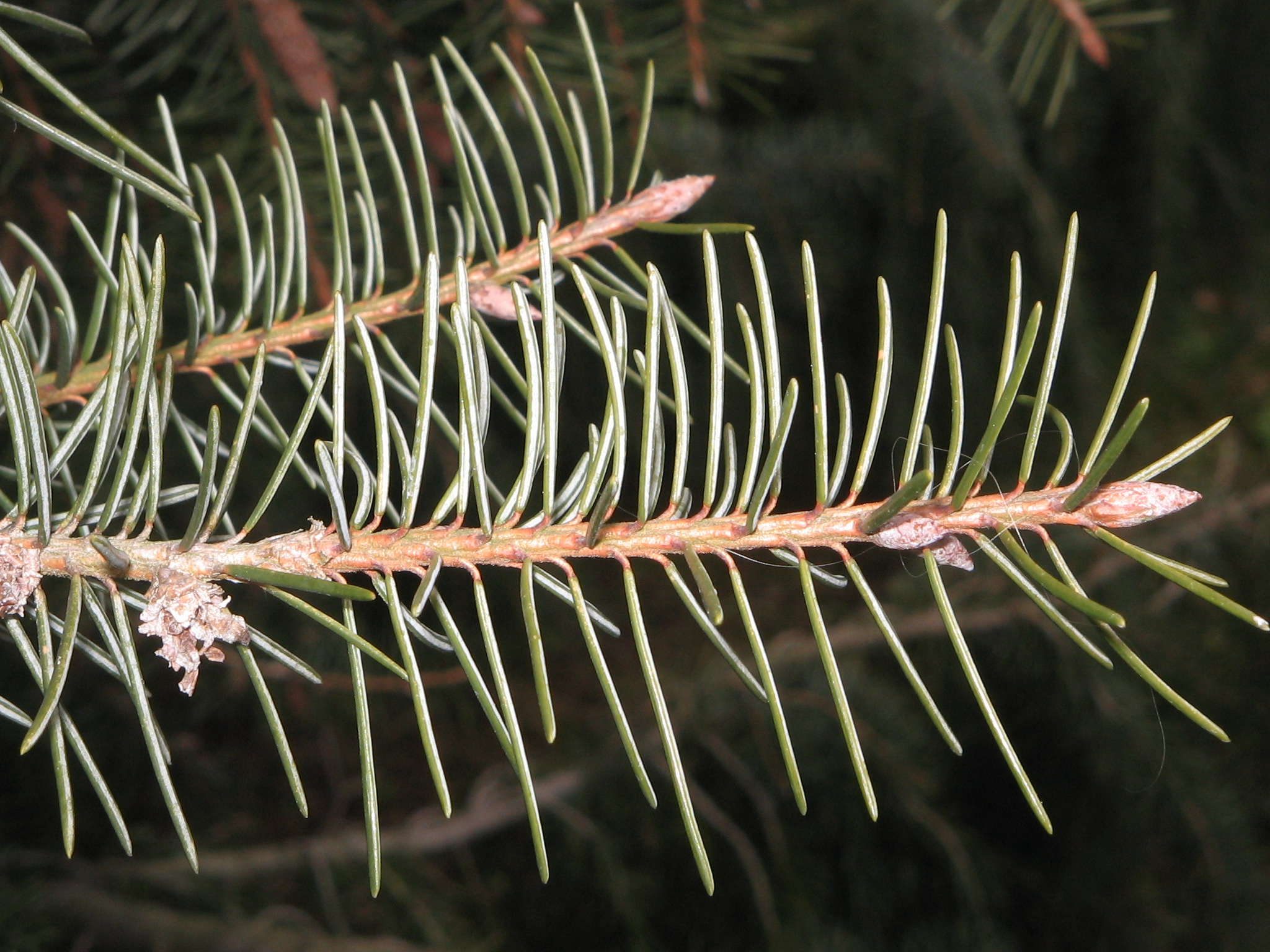
Close-up foliage

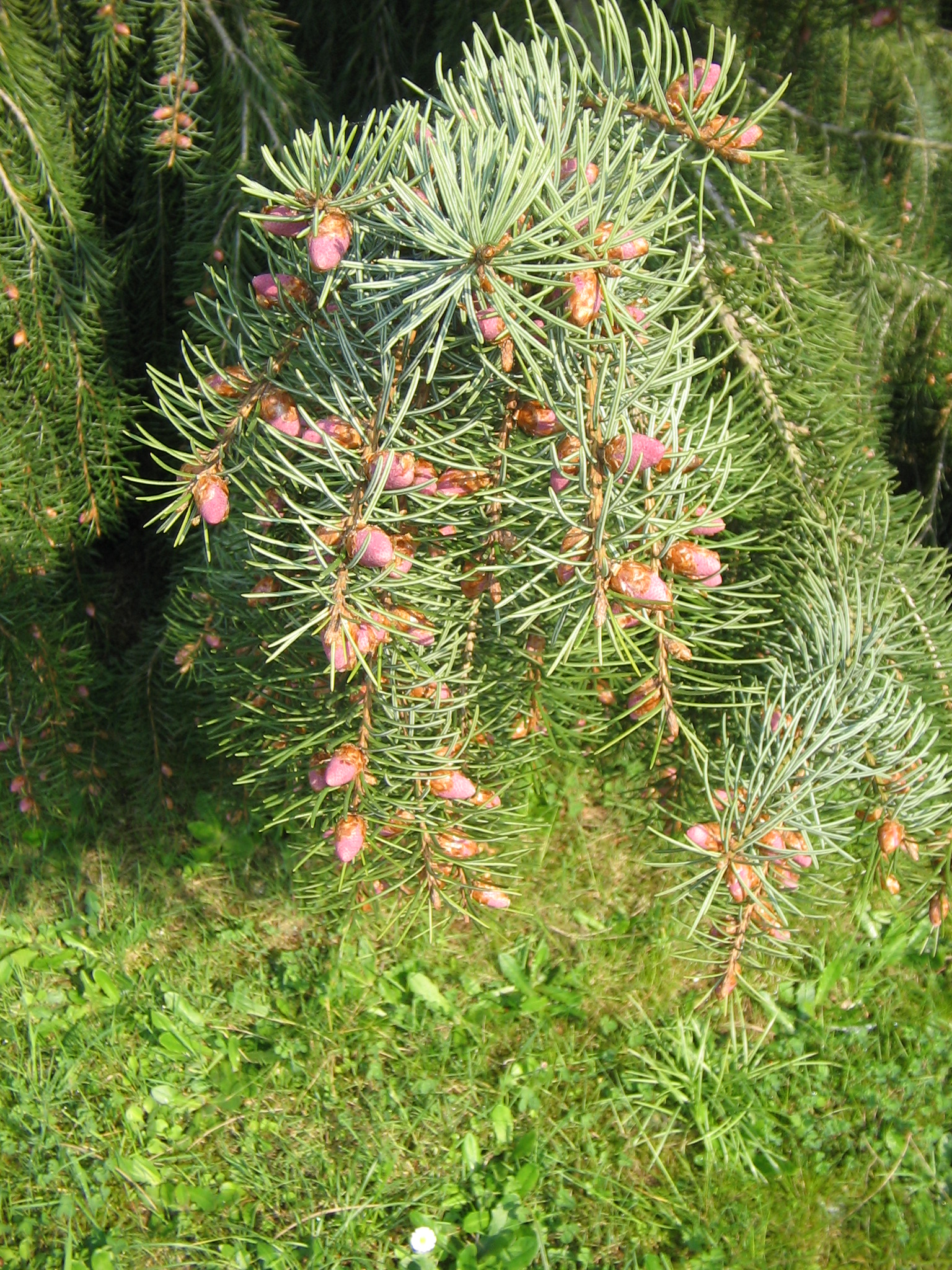
Fresh female cones

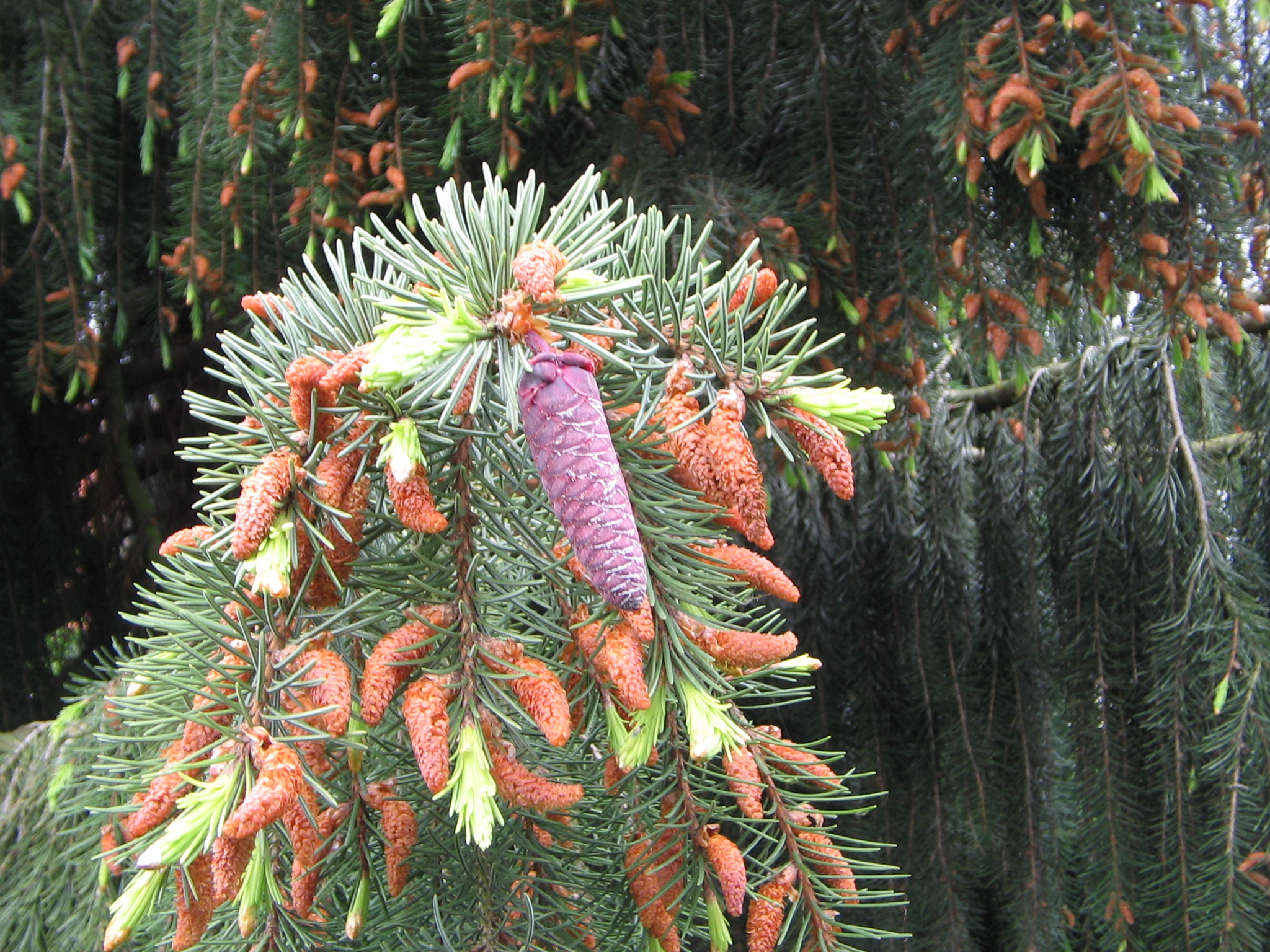
Mature male cones & developing female cone

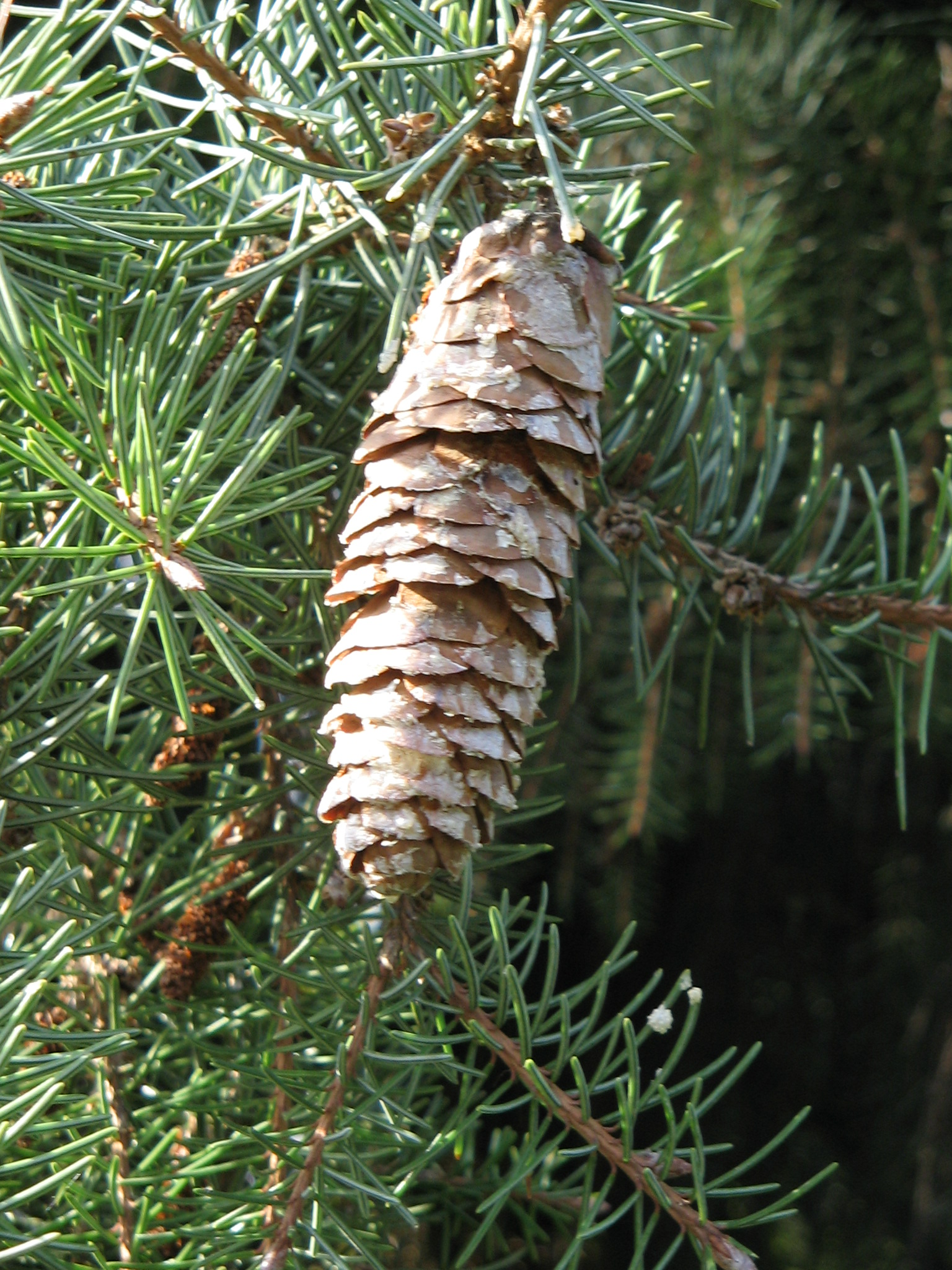
Mature cone

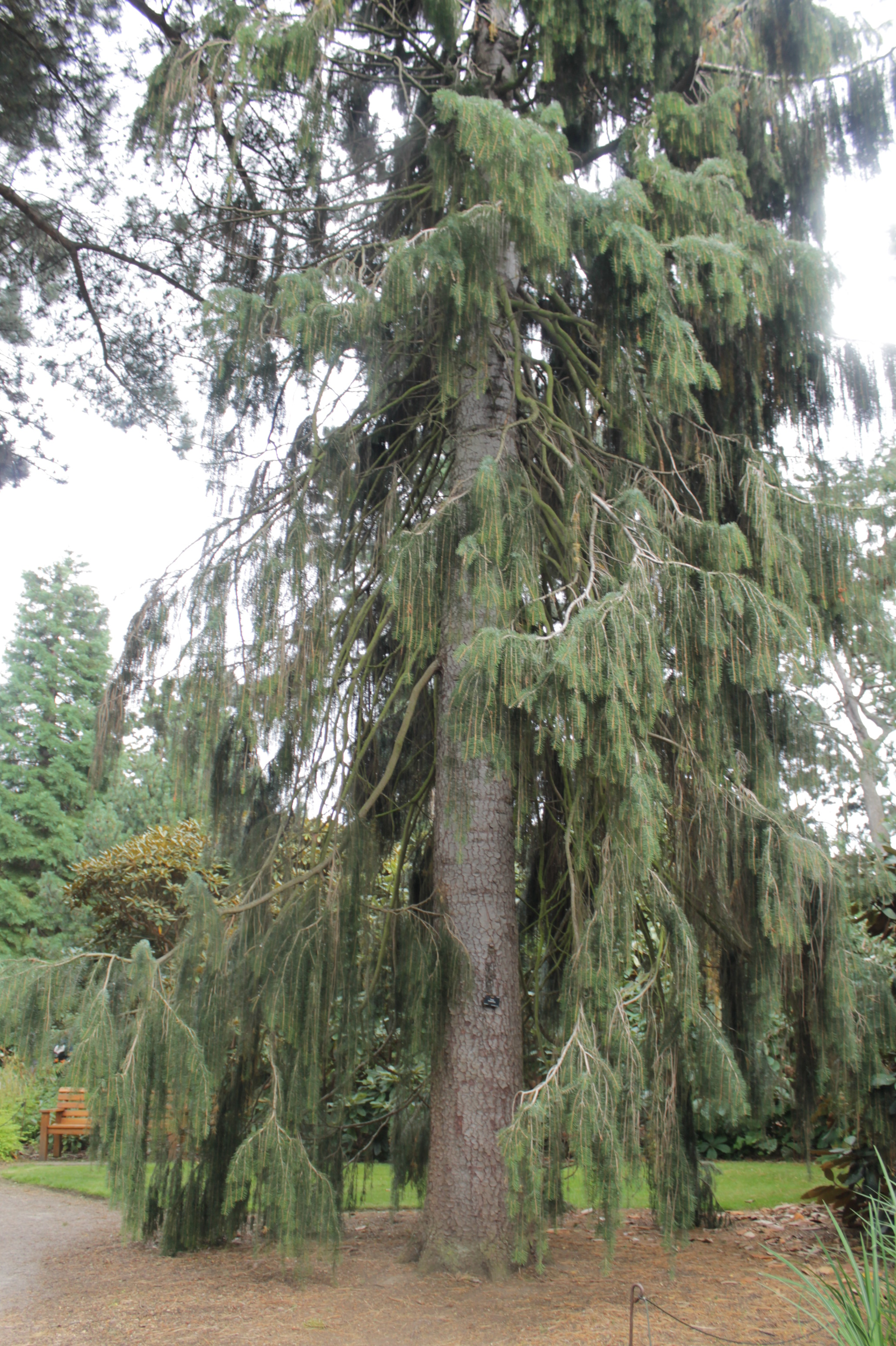
Mature Picea breweriana, Royal Botanic Garden, Edinburgh
