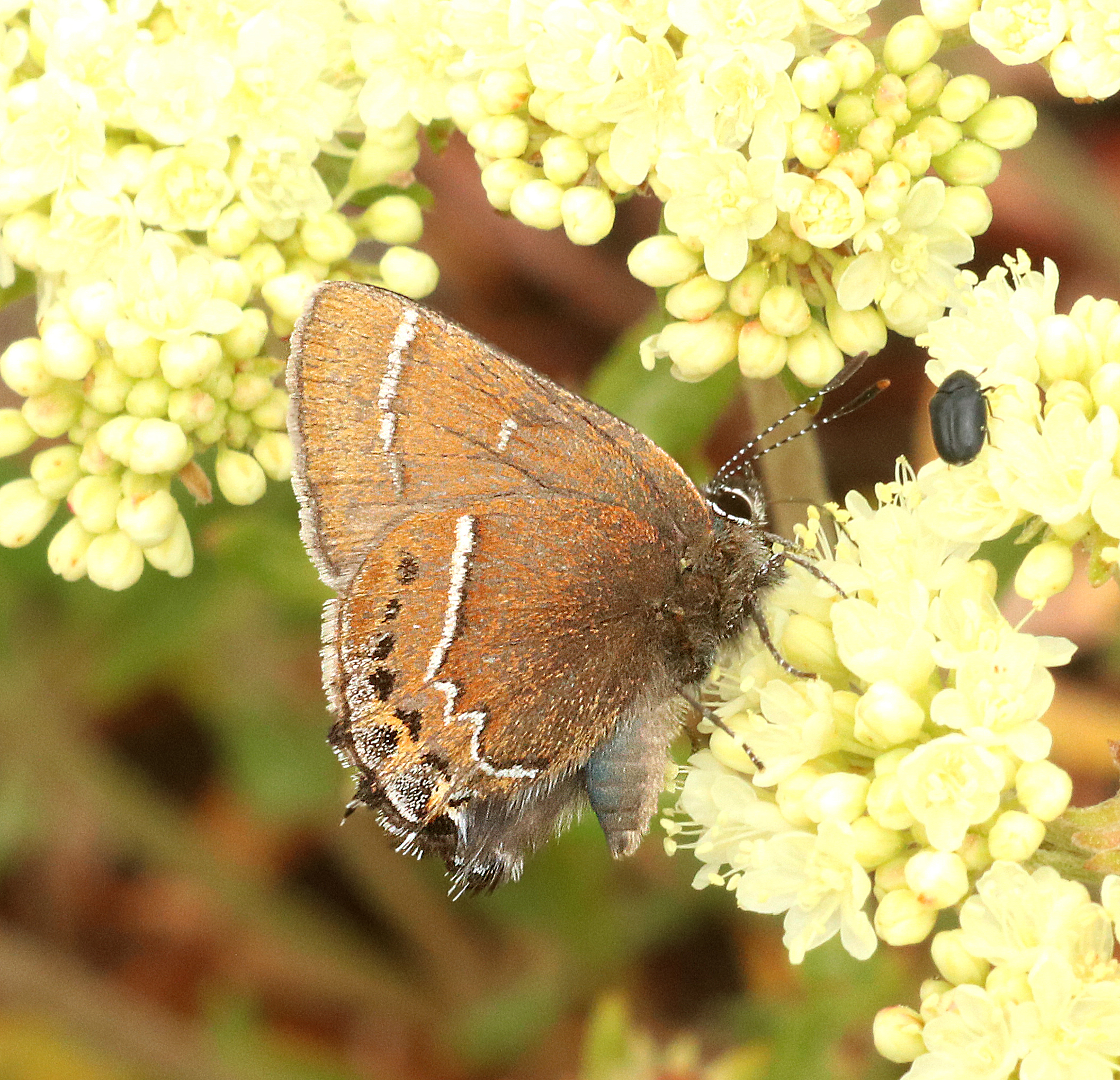

Scientific classification
- Kingdom: Animalia
- Phylum: Arthropoda
- Class: Insecta
- Order: Lepidoptera
- Family: Lycaenidae
- Genus: Callophrys
- Species: C. spinetorum

Binomial name
- Callophrys spinetorum (Hewitson, 1867)

Synonyms
- Thecla spinetorum Hewitson, 1867; Mitoura spinetorum; Cisincisalia spinetorum; Loranthomitoura spinetorum; Thecla ninus Edwards, 1871; Miltoura spinetorum cuyamaca Wright, 1922; Callophrys (Mitoura) millerorum Clench, 1981

= Callophrys spinetorum =

Thicket hairstreak

Species of butterfly

Callophrys spinetorum, the thicket hairstreak, is a butterfly of the family Lycaenidae. It was described by William Chapman Hewitson in 1867. It is found in North America from British Columbia through the Rocky Mountains to New Mexico and Mexico and through California to Baja California. The habitat consists of pinyon-juniper forests, mixed woodlands, and coniferous forests.

The wingspan is 25–32 mm. Adults are on wing from May to August in one generation per year. They feed on flower nectar.

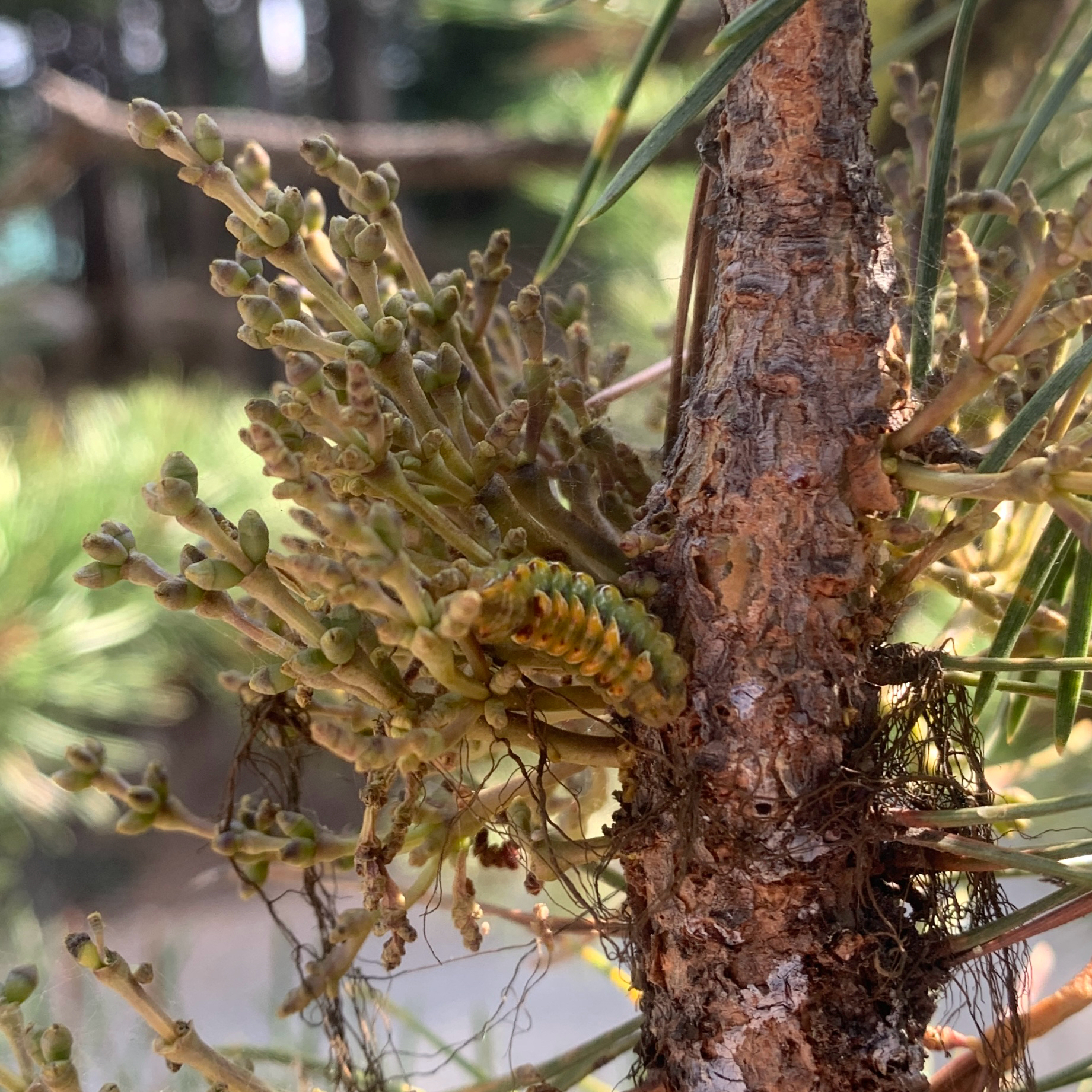
a C. spinetorum larva feeding on Arceuthobium americanum in the Wallowa Mountains of Oregon

The larvae are specialists, feeding on the shoots, flowers, and fruit of dwarf mistletoes in the genus Arceuthobium. In particular, larvae have been documented feeding on A. campylopodum, A. occidentale, A. abietinum, A. blumeri, A. cyanocarpum, A. laricis, A. vaginatum subsp. cryptopodum, A. divaricatum, and A. globosum. The larvae resemble their host plants, both because of their segmented bodies and because they take on the color of their food, an example of mimicry.

== Subspecies ==
- Callophrys spinetorum spinetorum (California, Colorado)
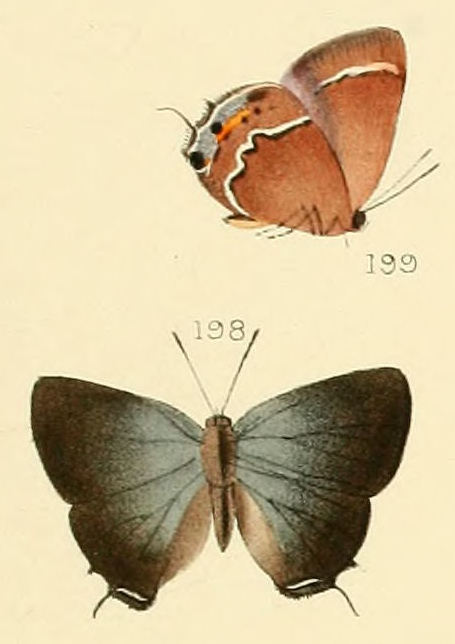
- an illustration from Hewitson's formal description of C. spinetorum
  Callophrys spinetorum millerorum Clench, 1981 (New Mexico)
