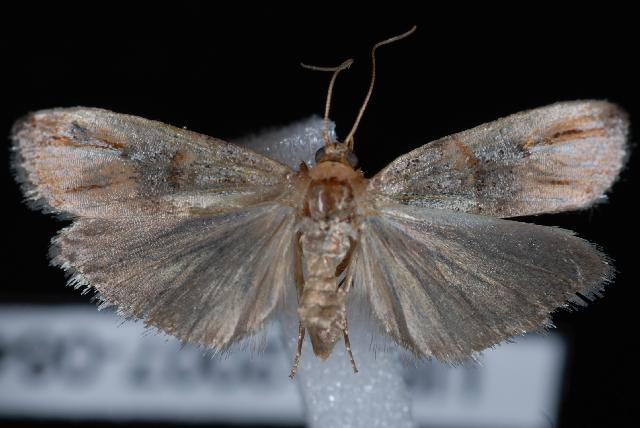

Scientific classification
- Kingdom: Animalia
- Phylum: Arthropoda
- Clade: Pancrustacea
- Class: Insecta
- Order: Lepidoptera
- Family: Pyralidae
- Genus: Dasypyga
- Species: D. alternosquamella

Binomial name
- Dasypyga alternosquamella Ragonot, 1887

Synonyms
- Dasypyga stictophorella Ragonot, 1887

= Dasypyga alternosquamella =

Species of moth

Dasypyga alternosquamella is a species of snout moth, family Pyralidae. It was described by Émile Louis Ragonot in 1887. It is known from western North America in both the United States and Canada.

The larvae feed exclusively on dwarf mistletoe (Arceuthobium) species, including Arceuthobium vaginatum subsp. cryptopodum and Arceuthobium campylopodum. Early in their development (first instar), larvae feed on the flowers and tips of dwarf mistletoe shoots, and in later stages they mine into the shoots, eating the mistletoe from within. Since the larvae mine from the base of mistletoe shoots, herbivory generally kills the plant, and large populations of D. alternosquamella can dramatically impact dwarf mistletoe ecology. The larvae are highly variable in color, depending on the color of the mistletoe shoots they feed on.
