= Dasypyga belizensis =

Scientific classification
- Domain: Eukaryota
- Kingdom: Animalia
- Phylum: Arthropoda
- Class: Insecta
- Order: Lepidoptera
- Family: Pyralidae
- Genus: Dasypyga
- Species: D. belizensis

Binomial name
- Dasypyga belizensis Neunzig and Dow, 1993

Species of moth

Dasypyga belizensis is a species of snout moth in the genus Dasypyga. It was described by Herbert H. Neunzig and L. C. Dow in 1993. It is found in Belize.
