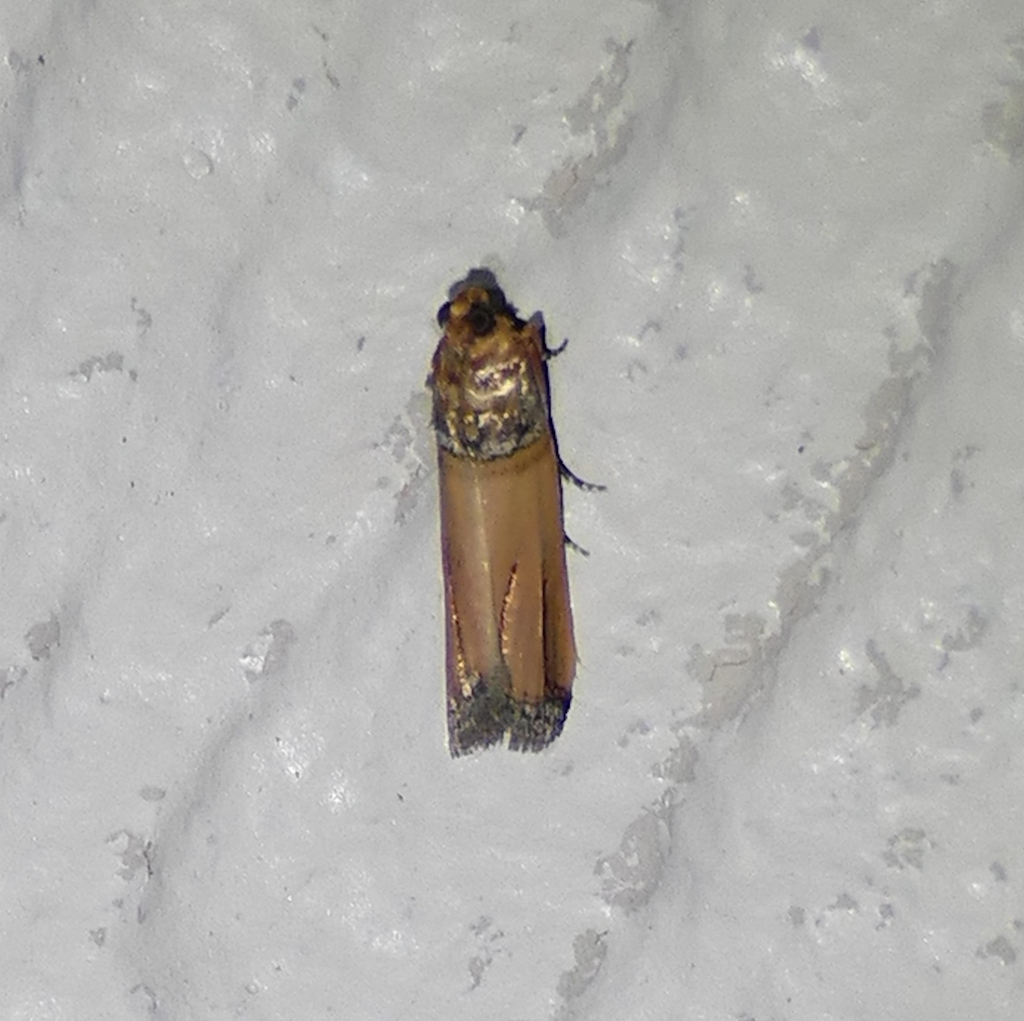

Scientific classification
- Domain: Eukaryota
- Kingdom: Animalia
- Phylum: Arthropoda
- Class: Insecta
- Order: Lepidoptera
- Family: Pyralidae
- Genus: Dasypyga
- Species: D. salmocolor

Binomial name
- Dasypyga salmocolor Blanchard, 1970

= Dasypyga salmocolor =

Species of moth

Dasypyga salmocolor is a species of snout moth in the genus Dasypyga. It was described by André Blanchard in 1970 and is known from the south-western United States, including Texas and California.
