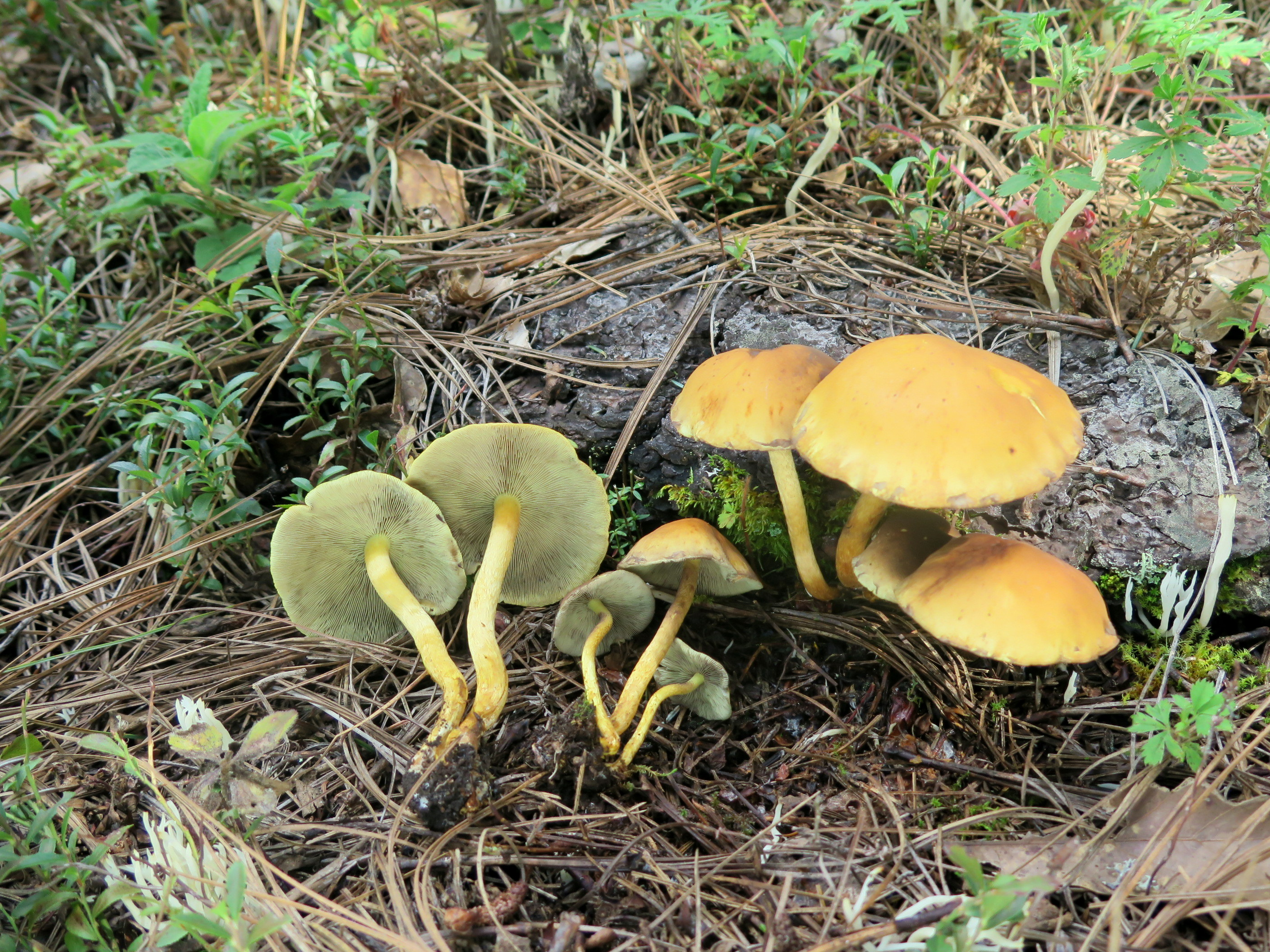

Scientific classification
- Kingdom: Fungi
- Division: Basidiomycota
- Class: Agaricomycetes
- Order: Agaricales
- Family: Strophariaceae
- Genus: Hypholoma
- Species: H. fasciculare

Binomial name
- Hypholoma fasciculare (Huds.:Fr.) P.Kumm. (1871)

Synonyms
- Agaricus fascicularis Huds. (1778); Naematoloma fasciculare (Huds.) P.Karst. (1880)

= Hypholoma fasciculare =

Species of fungus

Hypholoma fasciculare
- Mycological characteristics
- Gills on hymenium
- Cap is convex
- Hymenium is adnate
- Stipe has a ring
- Spore print is purple-brown
- Ecology is saprotrophic
- Edibility is poisonous

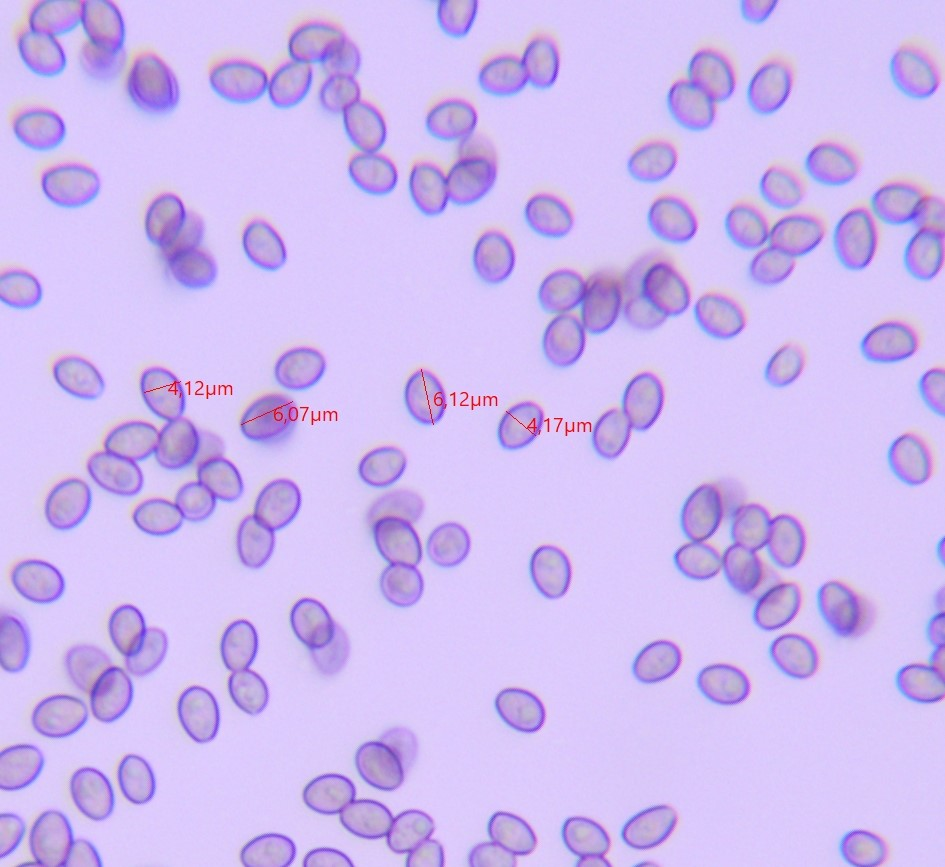
Spores of the Hypholoma fasciculare.

Hypholoma fasciculare, commonly known as the sulphur tuft or clustered woodlover, is a common woodland mushroom, often in evidence when hardly any other mushrooms are to be found. This saprotrophic small gill fungus grows prolifically in large clumps on stumps, dead roots or rotting trunks of broadleaved trees.

The "sulphur tuft" is bitter and poisonous; consuming it can cause vomiting, diarrhea and convulsions.

== Taxonomy ==
The specific epithet is derived from the Latin fascicularis 'in bundles' or 'clustered', referring to its habit of growing in clumps. Its name in Japanese is Nigakuritake (苦栗茸, means "Bitter kuritake").

== Description ==
The hemispherical cap ranges from 2–8 cm (3/4–3 1/8 in) in diameter. It is smooth and sulphur yellow with an orange-brown centre and whitish margin. The crowded gills are initially yellow but darken to a distinctive green colour as the blackish spores develop on the yellow flesh. It has a purple-brown spore print. The stipe is 3–12 cm (1 1/8–4 3/4 in) tall and 3–10 mm wide, light yellow, orange-brown below, often with an indistinct ring zone coloured dark by the spores. The taste is very bitter.

=== Similar species ===
The edible Hypholoma capnoides is similar, but lacks the greenish-yellow gills and bitter taste. H. sublateritium is similar as well, with a reddish cap. Members of Pyrrhulomyces may also appear similar.

=== Microscopic characteristics ===
The spores are purple-black in colour. The spores are 6–8 × 3.5–5 μm in size and are shaped like an egg.

== Distribution and habitat ==
Hypholoma fasciculare grows prolifically on the dead wood of both deciduous and coniferous trees. It is more commonly found on decaying deciduous wood due to the lower lignin content of this wood relative to coniferous wood. Hypholoma fasciculare is widespread and abundant in northern Europe and North America. It has been recorded from Iran, and also eastern Anatolia in Turkey. It can appear anytime from spring to autumn.

== Use in forestry ==
Hypholoma fasciculare has been used successfully as an experimental treatment to competitively displace a common fungal disease of conifers, Armillaria root rot, from managed coniferous forests.

== Toxicity ==
Fasciculols, the toxic constituents of Hypholoma fasciculare mushrooms

The toxicity of sulfur tuft mushrooms has been attributed, at least partially, to the toxic steroids fasciculol E and fasciculol F (in mice, with LD_{50}(i.p.) values of 50 mg/kg and 168 mg/kg, respectively). These fasciculols have been shown to be calmodulin inhibitors. In humans, symptoms may be delayed for 5–10 hours after consumption, after which time there may be diarrhea, nausea, vomiting, proteinuria and collapse. Paralysis and impaired vision have been recorded. Symptoms generally resolve over a few days. The autopsy of one fatality revealed fulminant hepatitis reminiscent of amatoxin poisoning, along with involvement of kidneys and myocardium. The mushroom was consumed in a dish with other species so the death cannot be attributed to sulfur tuft with certainty.

== Potential uses ==
Extracts of the mushroom show anticoagulant effects.

== Gallery ==
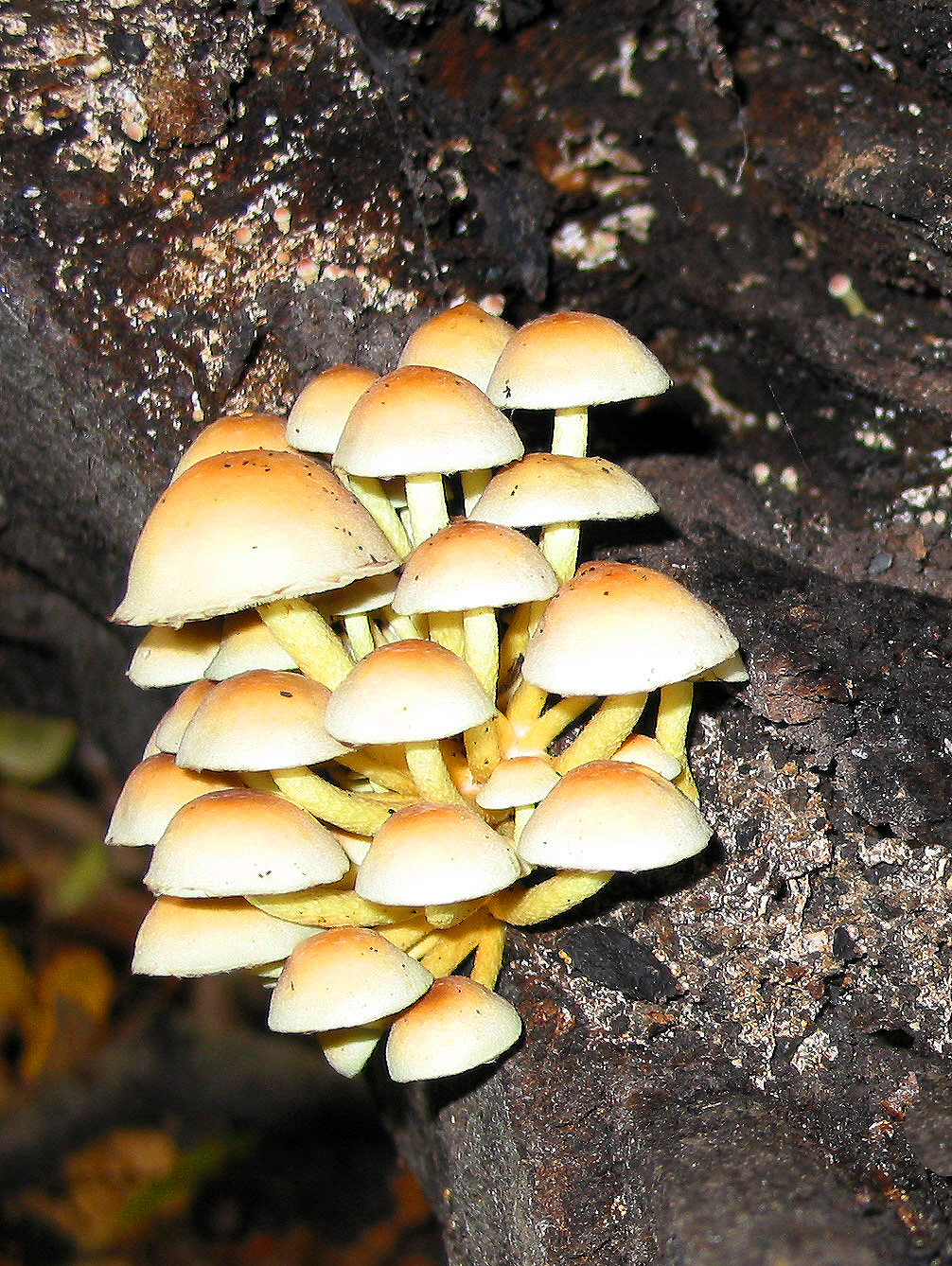
Hypholoma fasciculare.

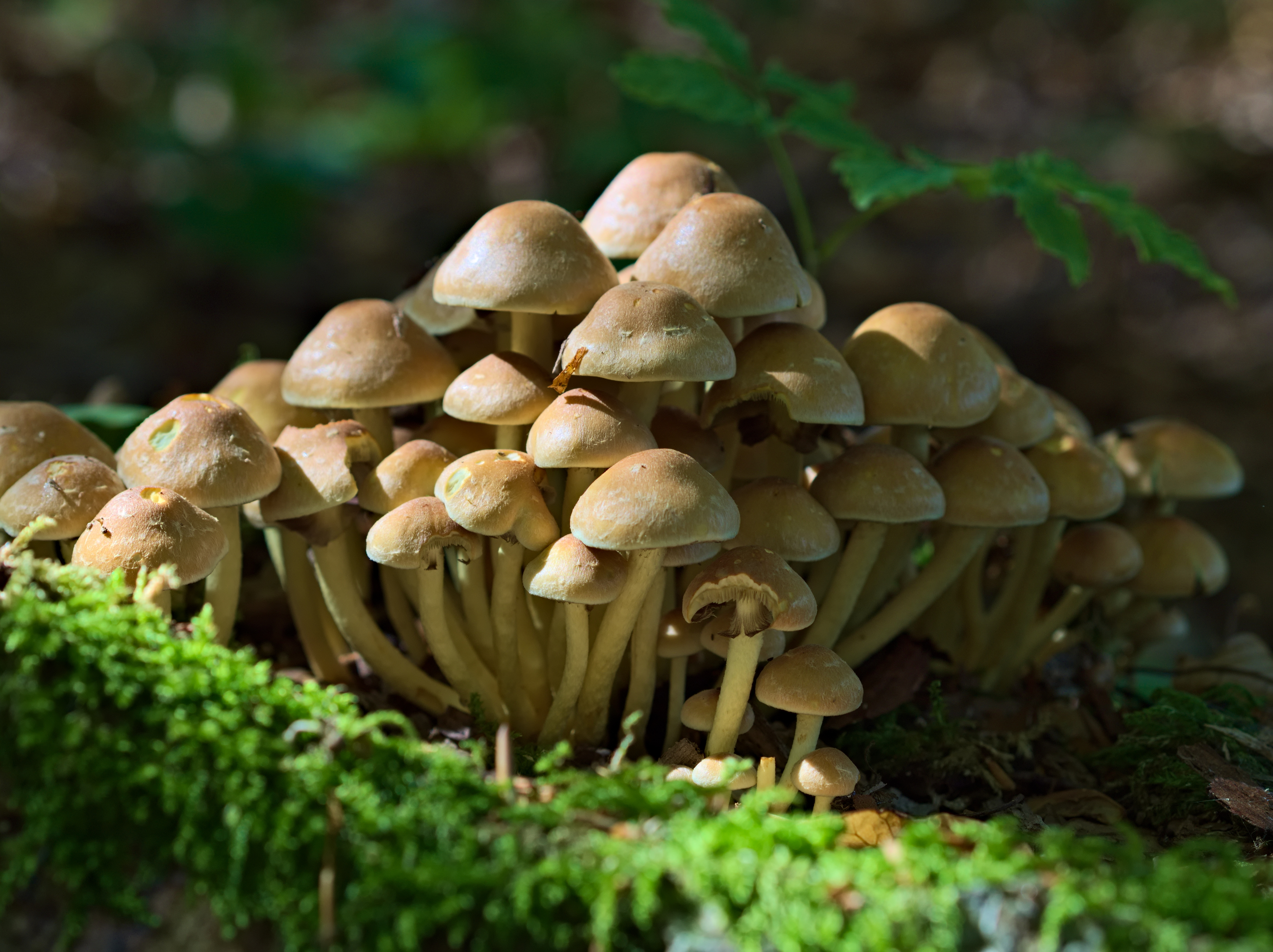
Hypholoma fasciculare in Germany

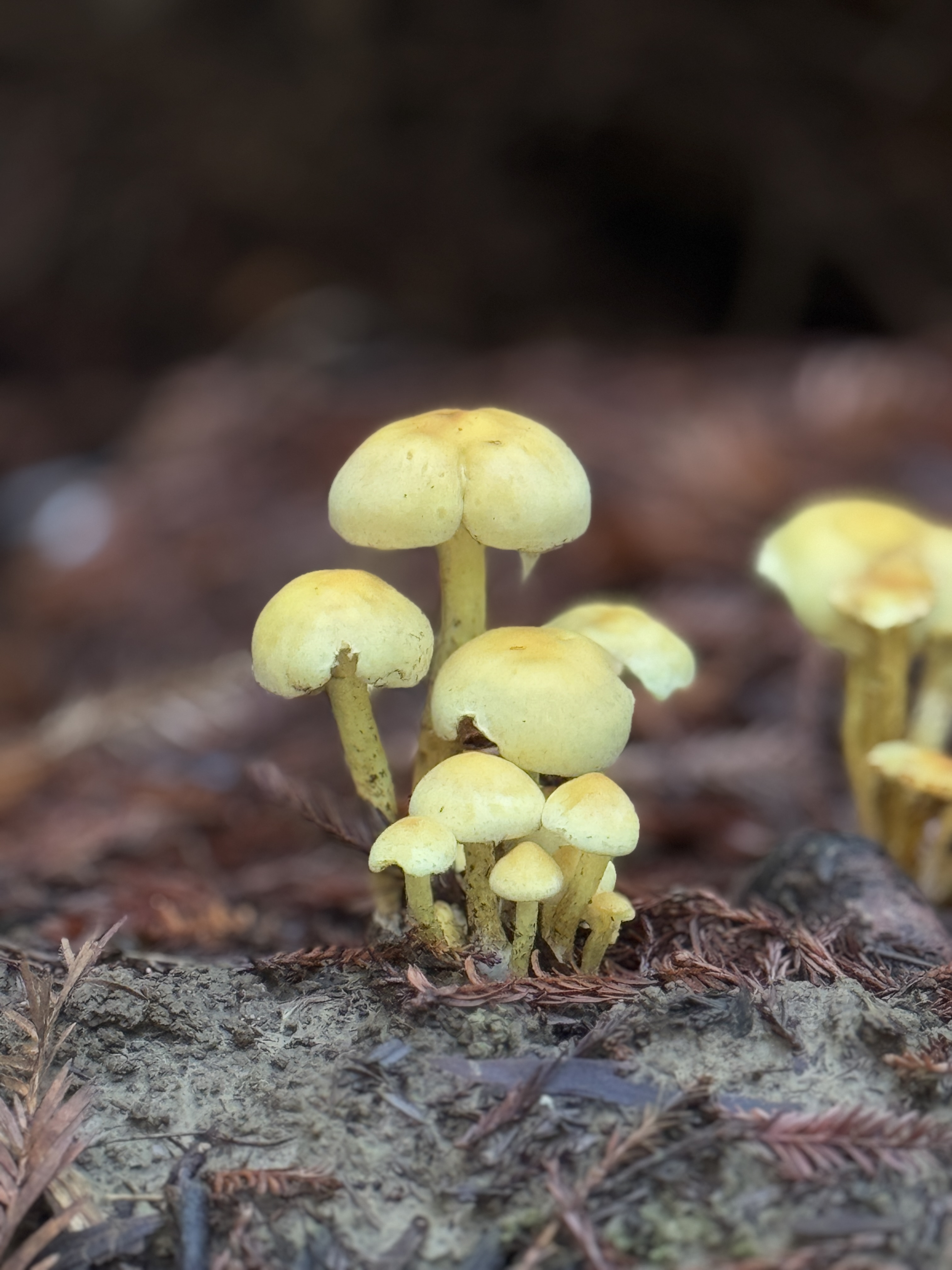
Hypholoma fasciculare in Humboldt Redwoods State Park in California

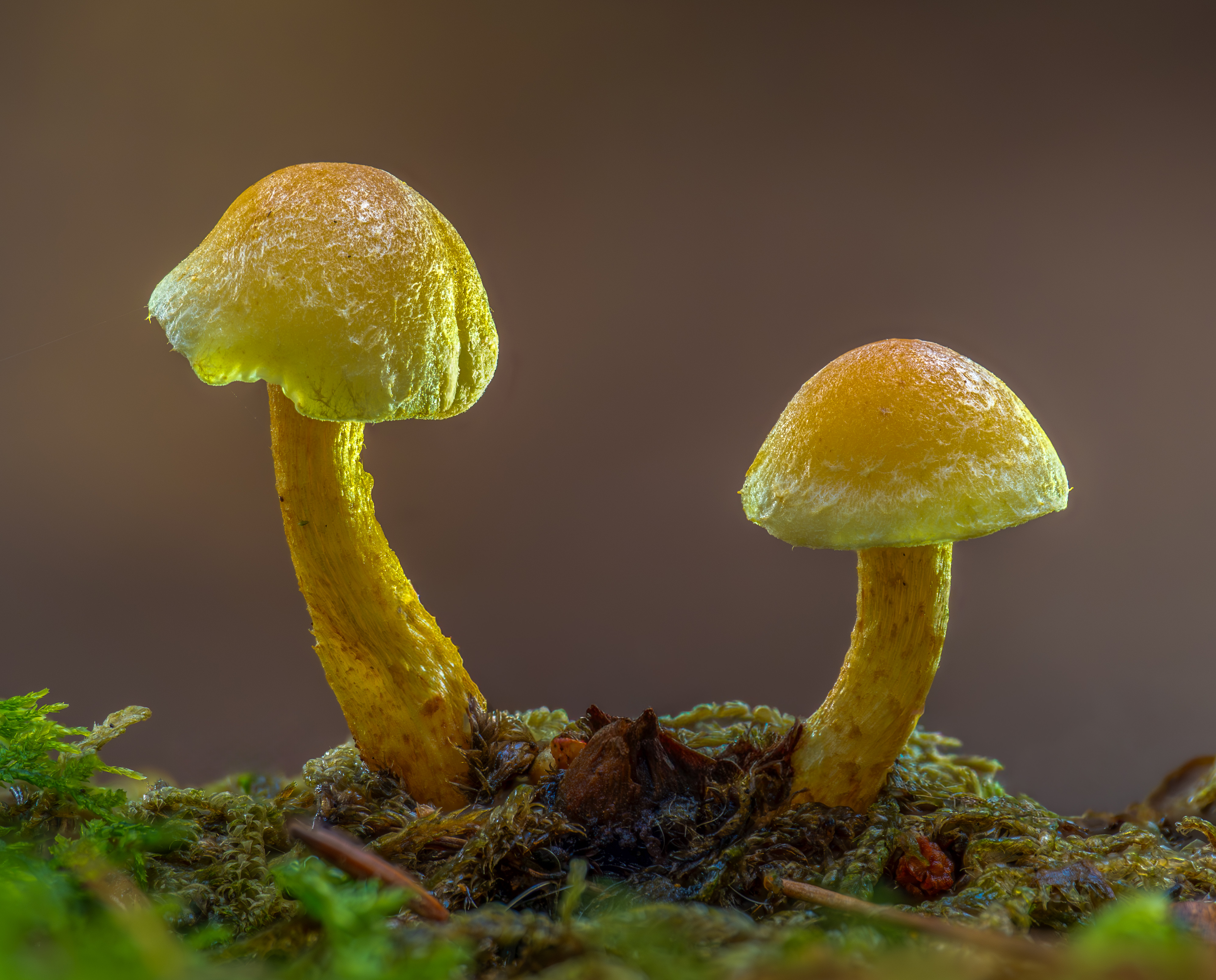
Hypholoma fasciculare in the Bruderwald Forest, Germany

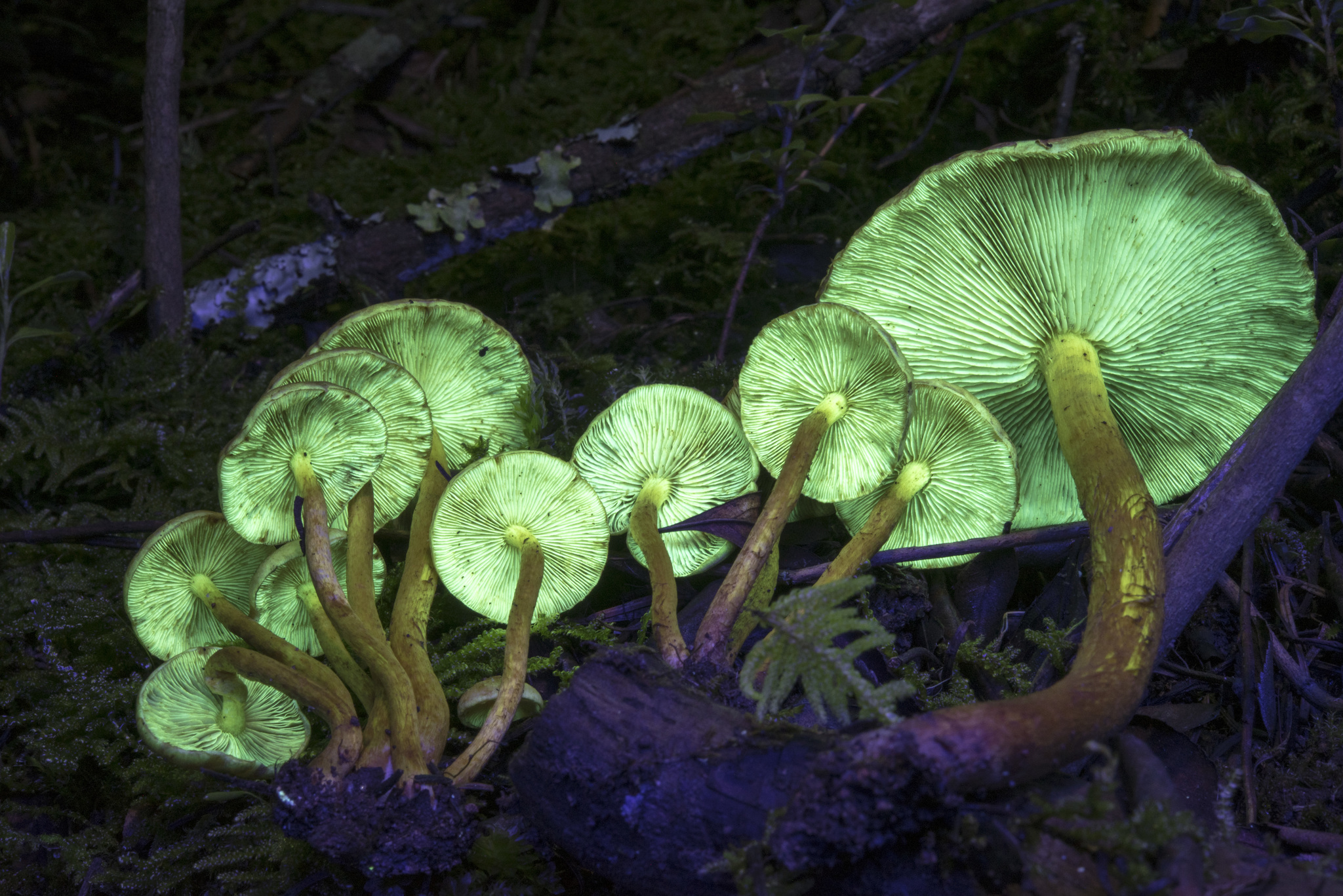
Hypholoma fasciculare fluorescing under 395 nm UV light
