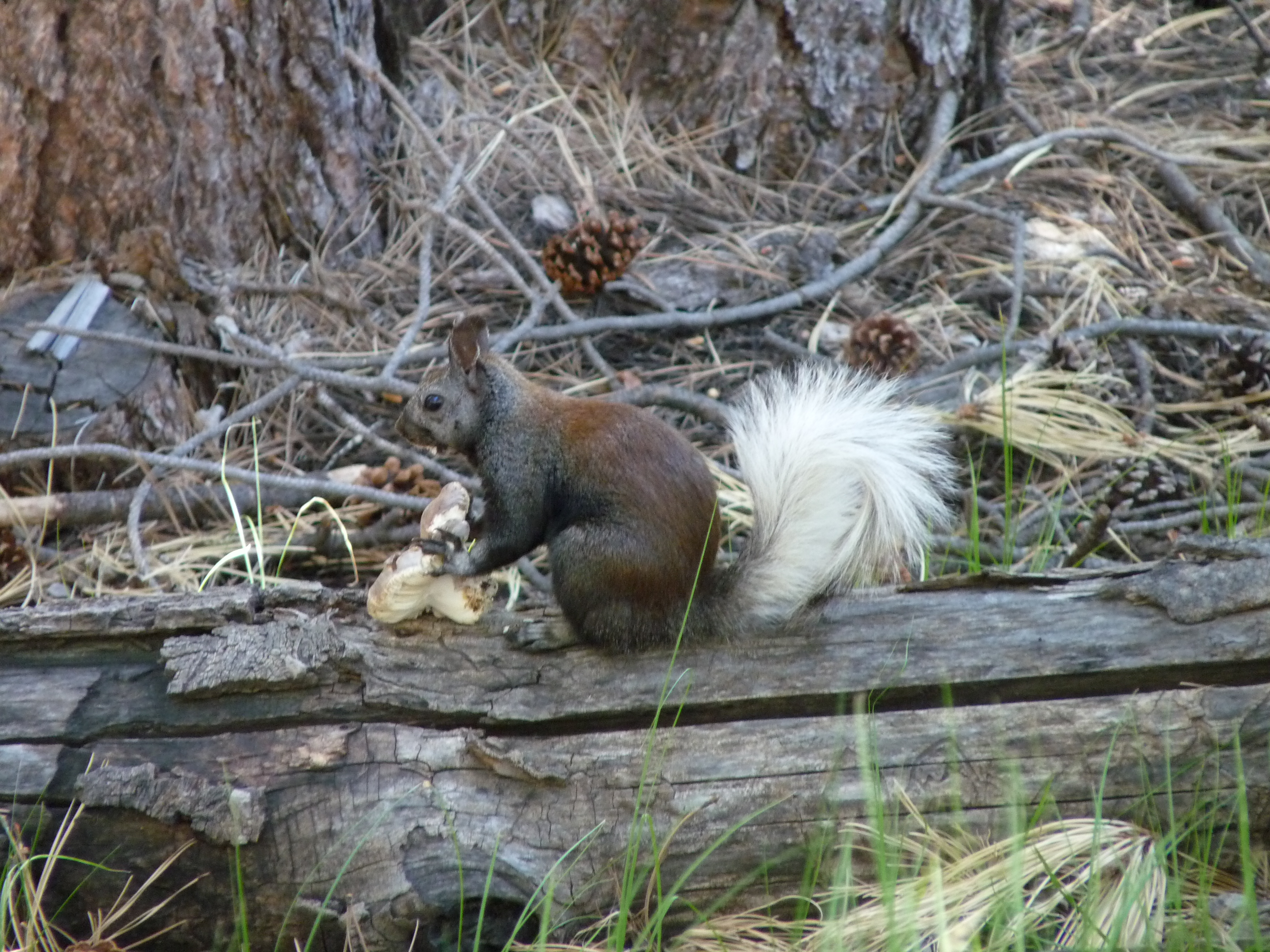
- In Grand Canyon National Park, Arizona

Scientific classification
- Kingdom: Animalia
- Phylum: Chordata
- Class: Mammalia
- Order: Rodentia
- Family: Sciuridae
- Genus: Sciurus
- Species: S. aberti
- Subspecies: S. a. kaibabensis

Trinomial name
- Sciurus aberti kaibabensis Merriam, 1904

= Kaibab squirrel =

Subspecies of rodent found in Arizona

The Kaibab squirrel (Sciurus aberti kaibabensis) is a tassel-eared squirrel endemic to the Kaibab Plateau in the Southwest United States, in an area of 20 by 40 miles (32 by 64 km). The squirrel's habitat is confined entirely to the ponderosa pine forests of the North Rim of Grand Canyon National Park and the northern section of Kaibab National Forest around the town of Jacob Lake, Arizona.

This squirrel is not found anywhere else in the world. In 1965, 200,000 acres (810 km^{2}) of Kaibab squirrel habitat within Grand Canyon National Park and Kaibab National Forest were declared the Kaibab Squirrel National Natural Landmark.

== Description ==
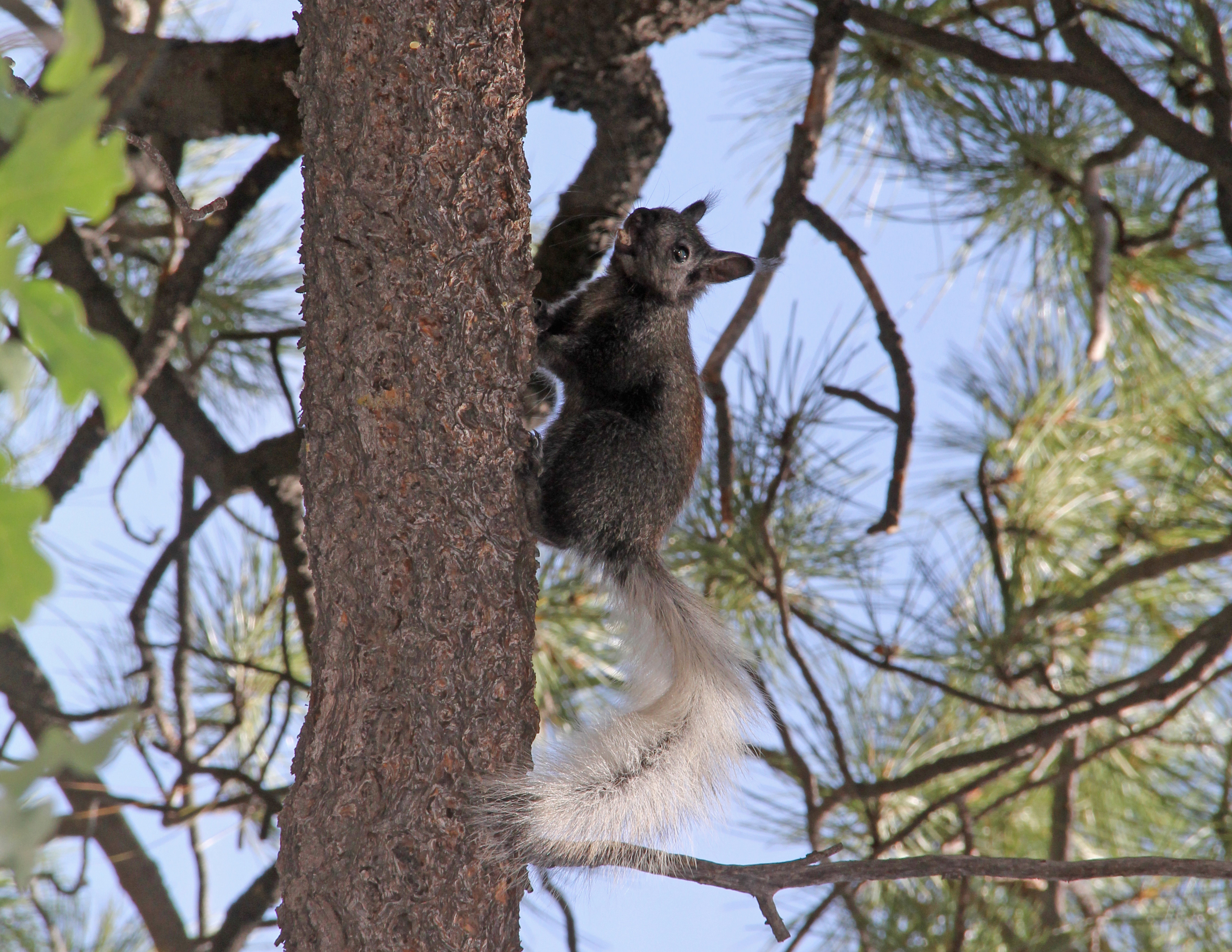
Kaibab squirrel at Grand Canyon National Park North Rim

Kaibab squirrels usually have a black belly (which is sometimes gray), white tail, tufted ears and chestnut brown back. The tufts on the ears grow longer with age and may extend 1 to 2 inches (2.5 to 5.1 cm) above the ears in the winter, and may not be visible in the summer.

== Ecology ==
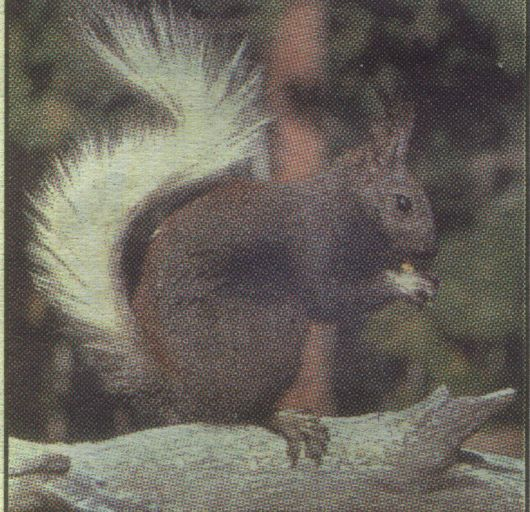
A Kaibab squirrel.

The Kaibab squirrel lives in ponderosa pine forests, where it builds its nest out of twigs and pine needles. Kaibab squirrels, ponderosa pines, and the fungi which grow in the vicinity of the ponderosas exist in a symbiotic relationship. The squirrel eats acorns, fruit, and fungi (especially an underground truffle), as well as the seeds, bark, and twigs of the trees where it makes its home. The Kaibab squirrel's most significant source of food is the seeds found within ponderosa pine cones. Young squirrels are born between April and August.

In the past the Kaibab squirrel was given species status (Sciurus kaibabensis), but it is now considered a subspecies of the Abert's squirrel (Sciurus aberti).

The Kaibab squirrel is an example of evolution occurring through geographic isolation, but not because of the canyon. Compared to the Kaibab squirrel, the Abert's squirrel, with its several subspecies, has a much broader distribution and is found on the South Rim of the Grand Canyon. The difference between North Rim and South Rim Abert's squirrels has given rise to the commonly held but incorrect assumption that the canyon itself acted as a barrier preventing gene flow between the two populations. However, modern Kaibab squirrels are descended from populations of Abert's squirrels that dispersed into the Grand Canyon area following the last Ice Age.

As the climate warmed, ponderosa pine stands and the Abert's squirrels living there were limited to areas of high elevation like the Kaibab Plateau. These isolated populations eventually became modern Kaibab squirrels and, as the climate cooled again and ponderosa pines once again grew at lower elevations, other Abert's squirrel subspecies returned to the Grand Canyon area, filling in their former niches on the South Rim.
