= Hypholoma capnoides =

Conservation status
- Least Concern (IUCN 3.1)

Scientific classification
- Kingdom: Fungi
- Division: Basidiomycota
- Class: Agaricomycetes
- Order: Agaricales
- Family: Strophariaceae
- Genus: Hypholoma
- Species: H. capnoides

Binomial name
- Hypholoma capnoides (Fr.) P.Kumm. (1871)

Synonyms
- Agaricus capnoides Fr. (1818)

Species of fungus

Hypholoma capnoides
- Mycological characteristics
- Gills on hymenium
- Cap is convex
- Hymenium is adnate
- Stipe has a ring
- Spore print is purple-brown
- Ecology is saprotrophic
- Edibility is not recommended

Hypholoma capnoides, commonly known as the conifer tuft, is a mushroom in the family Strophariaceae. Found in both the Old and New World, it grows on decaying wood and is edible, though may resemble some poisonous species.

== Description ==
The cap is up to 8 centimetres (3 inches) in diameter with yellow-to-orange-brownish or matt yellow colour, sometimes viscid. It is convex then flattens in age. The stipe is yellowish, somewhat rust-brown below, growing to 12 cm (4 3/4 in) long. The flesh is yellow. The taste is mild, compared to most Hypholomas which are bitter.

The gills are initially pale orangish-yellow, pale grey when mature, later darker purple to brown. The spore print is dark burgundy to brown.

=== Similar species ===
The poisonous Hypholoma fasciculare (sulphur tuft) is more common in many areas. H. capnoides has greyish gills due to the dark color of its spores, whereas sulphur tuft has greenish gills. It could also perhaps be confused with the deadly Galerina marginata or the good edible Kuehneromyces mutabilis.

Additionally, it resembles members of Flammula and Pholiota.

== Distribution and habitat ==
Like its poisonous relative H. fasciculare ('sulphur tuft'), H. capnoides grows in clusters on decaying wood, for example in tufts on old tree stumps, in North America, Europe, and Asia.

== Edibility ==
Though edible when cooked, it could be confused with some poisonous species.
