= Dasypyga independencia =

Scientific classification
- Domain: Eukaryota
- Kingdom: Animalia
- Phylum: Arthropoda
- Class: Insecta
- Order: Lepidoptera
- Family: Pyralidae
- Genus: Dasypyga
- Species: D. independencia

Binomial name
- Dasypyga independencia Neunzig, 1996

Species of moth

Dasypyga independencia is a species of snout moth in the genus Dasypyga. It was described by Herbert H. Neunzig in 1996 and is known from the Dominican Republic.

The length of the forewings is 11–12.5 mm.

The larvae possibly feed on mistletoe.
