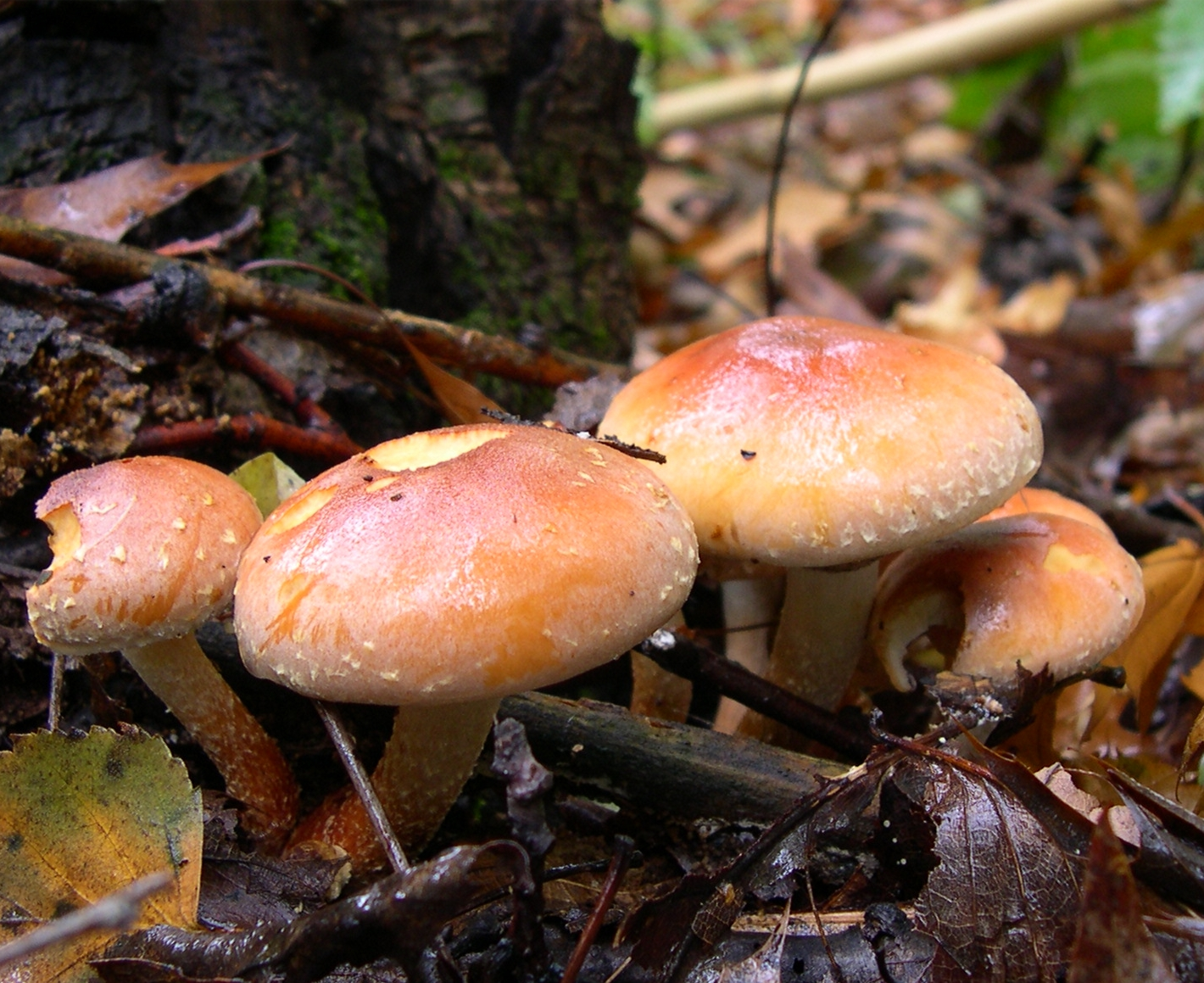

Scientific classification
- Kingdom: Fungi
- Division: Basidiomycota
- Class: Agaricomycetes
- Order: Agaricales
- Family: Strophariaceae
- Genus: Hypholoma
- Species: H. lateritium

Binomial name
- Hypholoma lateritium (Schaeff.) P. Kumm.

Synonyms
- Agaricus carneolus Batsch (1783); Agaricus lateritius Schaeff. (1774); Agaricus lateritius var. communis Alb. & Schwein. (1805); Agaricus lateritius var. pomposus (Bolton) Pers. (1801); Agaricus pomposus Schumach. (1803); Agaricus pomposus Bolton (1788); Agaricus sublateritius Fr. (1838); Agaricus sublateritius var. schaefferi Berk. & Broome (1879); Agaricus sublateritius var. squamosus Cooke, Illustrations of British Fungi (Hymenomycetes) (London) 4: pl. 573 (558) (1886); Agaricus sublateritius var. sublateritius Schaeff.(1774); Cortinarius schaefferi (Berk. & Broome) Rob. Henry (1981); Deconica squamosa Cooke (1885); Dryophila sublateritia (Fr.) Quél. (1888); Geophila sublateritia (Fr.) Quél. (1886); Hypholoma lateritium var. lateritium (Schaeff.) P. Kumm. (1871); Hypholoma lateritium var. pomposum (Bolton) P. Roux & Guy García (2006); Hypholoma sublateritium (Fr.) Quél. (1872); Hypholoma sublateritium f. pomposum (Bolton) Massee (1892); Hypholoma sublateritium f. sublateritium (Fr.) Quél. (1872); Hypholoma sublateritium f. vulgaris Massee (1892); Hypholoma sublateritium var. aranoides Raithelh. (1991); Hypholoma sublateritium var. pomposum (Bolton) Rea (1922); Hypholoma sublateritium var. schaefferi (Berk. & Broome) Sacc. (1887); Hypholoma sublateritium var. squamosum (Cooke) Sacc. (1887); Hypholoma sublateritium var. sublateritium (Fr.) Quél.(1872); Naematoloma sublateritium (Fr.) P. Karst. (1879); Pratella lateritia (Schaeff.) Gray (1821); Psilocybe lateritia (Schaeff.) Noordel. (1995)

= Hypholoma lateritium =

Species of fungus

Hypholoma lateritium
- Mycological characteristics
- Gills on hymenium
- Cap is convex
- Hymenium is adnate
- Stipe is bare
- Spore print is purple-brown
- Ecology is saprotrophic
- Edibility is choice

Hypholoma lateritium, sometimes called brick cap, chestnut mushroom, cinnamon cap, brick top, red woodlover or kuritake, is a species of fungus in the genus Hypholoma, which also contains the slightly smaller poisonous species Hypholoma fasciculare.

== Taxonomy ==
Hypholoma sublateritium is a synonym.

== Description ==
The cap is 3.5–9 centimetres (1 1/2–3 1/2 in) in diameter, usually with a brick-red coloration in the center and a paler margin. It is smooth, sometimes with red-brown flecks in the middle and sometimes with flaky veil remnants, which can easily be washed off in the rain, on the outside. The gills are crowded, starting yellowish and becoming grayish with age. They do not have the green color of Hypholoma fasciculare. The stipe is up to 12 cm (4 3/4 in) long, light yellow and darker below.

The spore print is purple-brown. The spores have a germ pore and are 6.0–7.5 × 3.5–4.0 μm, ellipsoid; smooth; thin-walled. Pleurocystidia are abundant, fusoid-ventricose to mucronate, and up to 40 x 10 μm. Cheilocystidia are fusoid-ventricose, cylindric or irregular, with subcapitate apices; hyaline; thin-walled; up to 35 x 8 μm.

=== Similar species ===
It could be confused with highly toxic species such as Galerina marginata or Hypholoma fasciculare. It can also resemble Pholiota mixta and members of Pyrrhulomyces.

== Distribution and habitat ==
In Pennsylvania, New Jersey, and West Virginia they are found in dense clusters on stumps and roots from October until long after frosts.

== Edibility ==
Hypholoma lateritium is sometimes considered edible but caution must be taken to avoid confusing it with similar-looking deadly species. In Europe the species is often considered inedible or even poisonous. Specimens are best when collected young; older specimens tend to be bitter from being fouled by insects.

The taste is mild to somewhat bitter, but when cooked the mushrooms have a nutty flavor. They are especially delicious when sauteed in olive oil. Brick tops have been considered one of the better edibles of late fall in the Northeast United States. It is considered a choice edible in Japan.

== Gallery ==
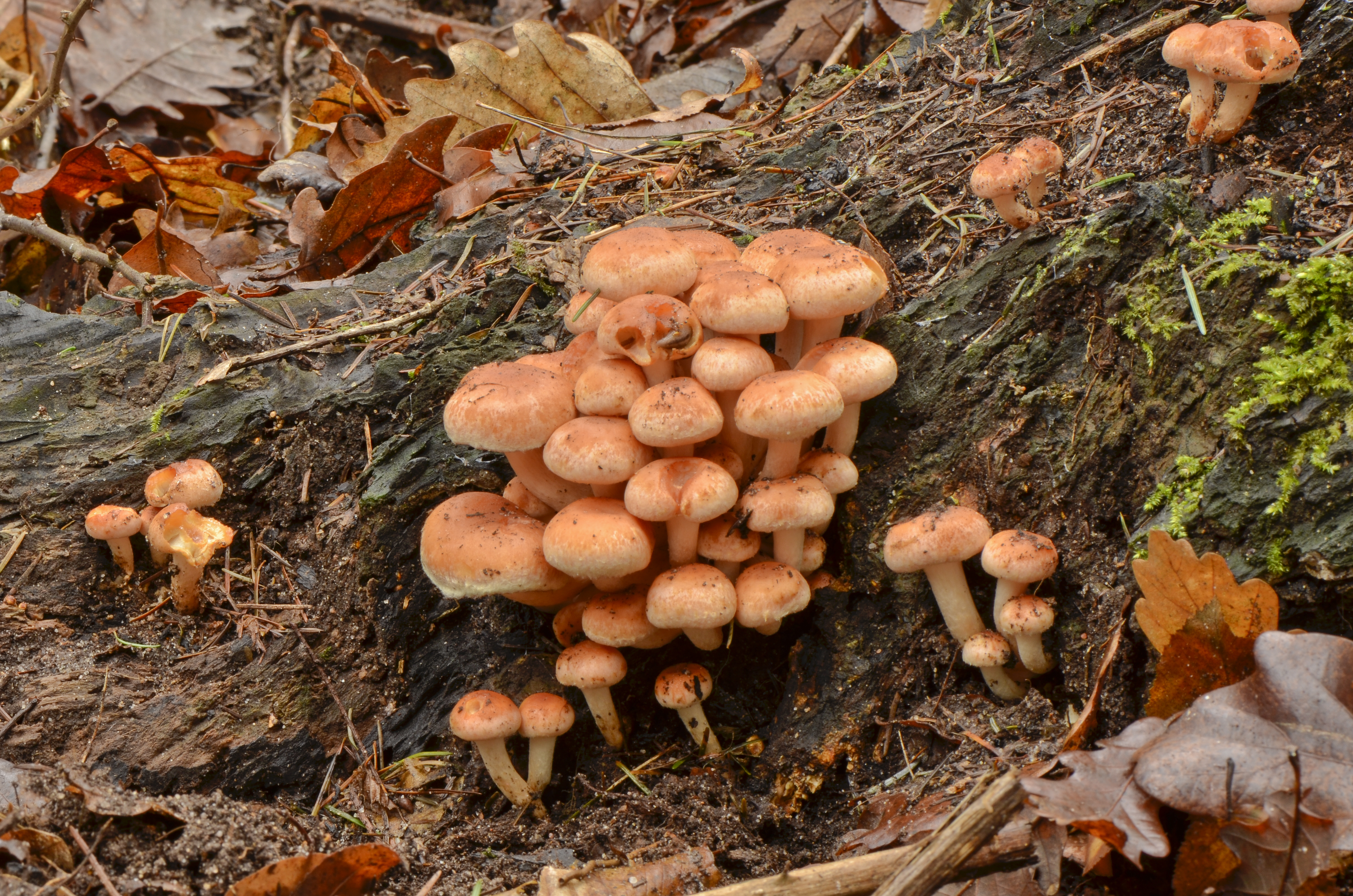

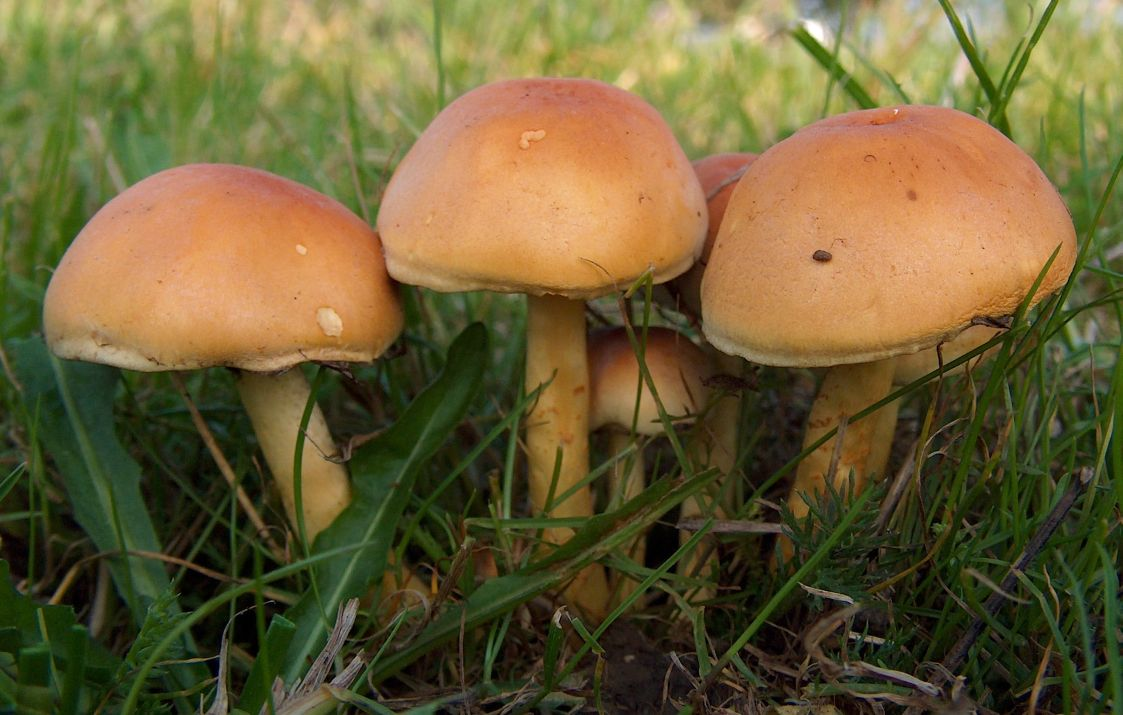

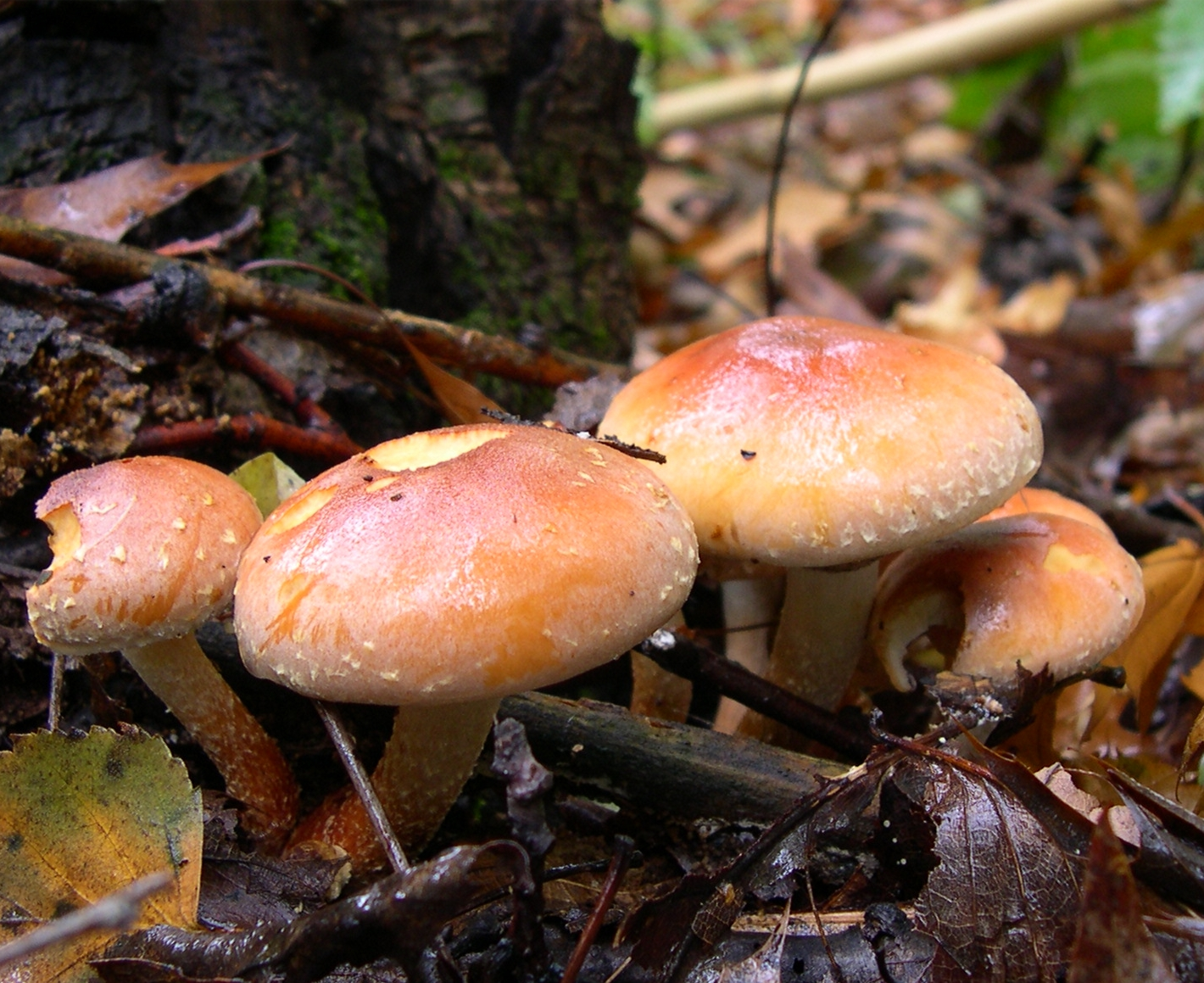

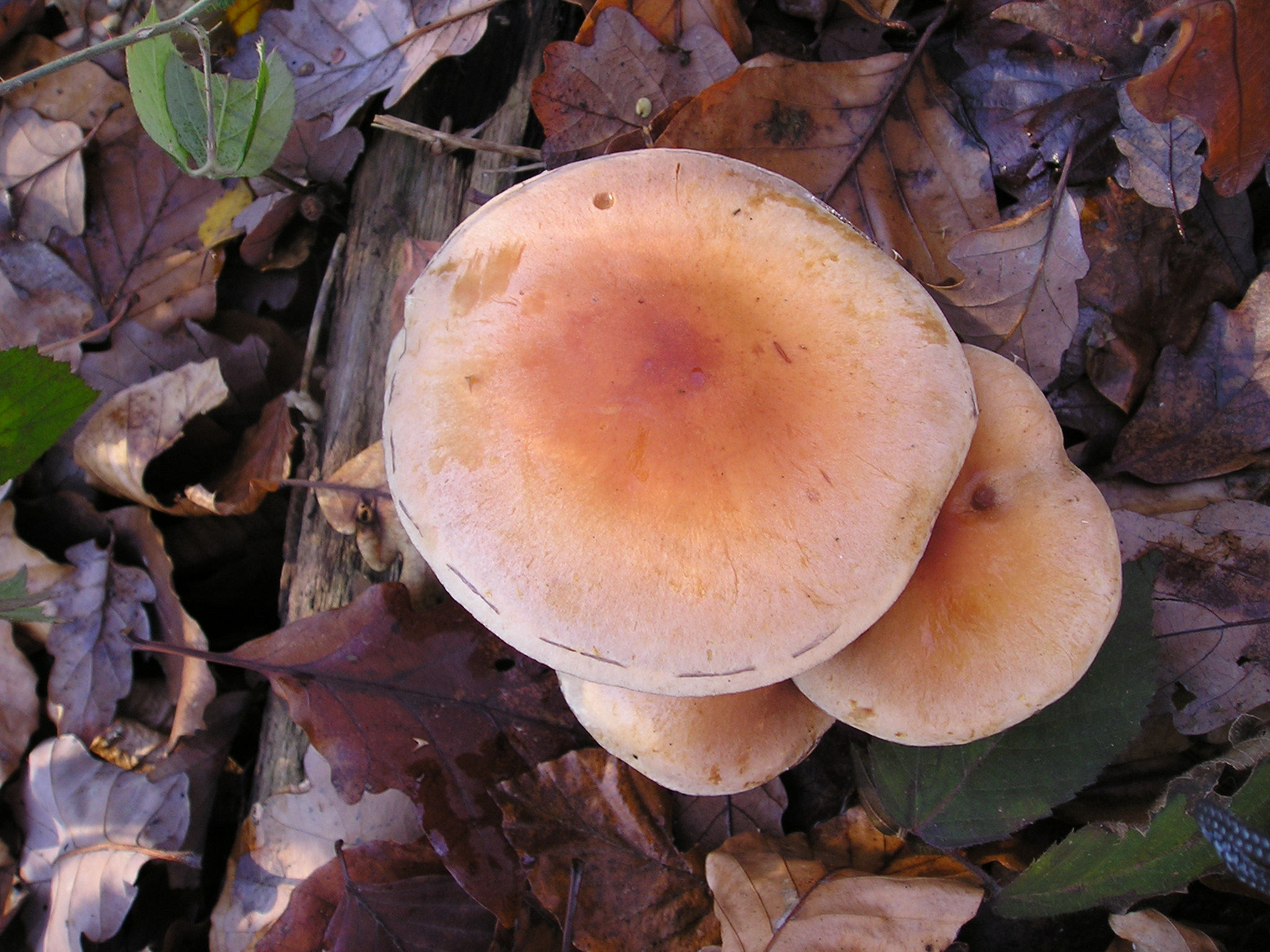

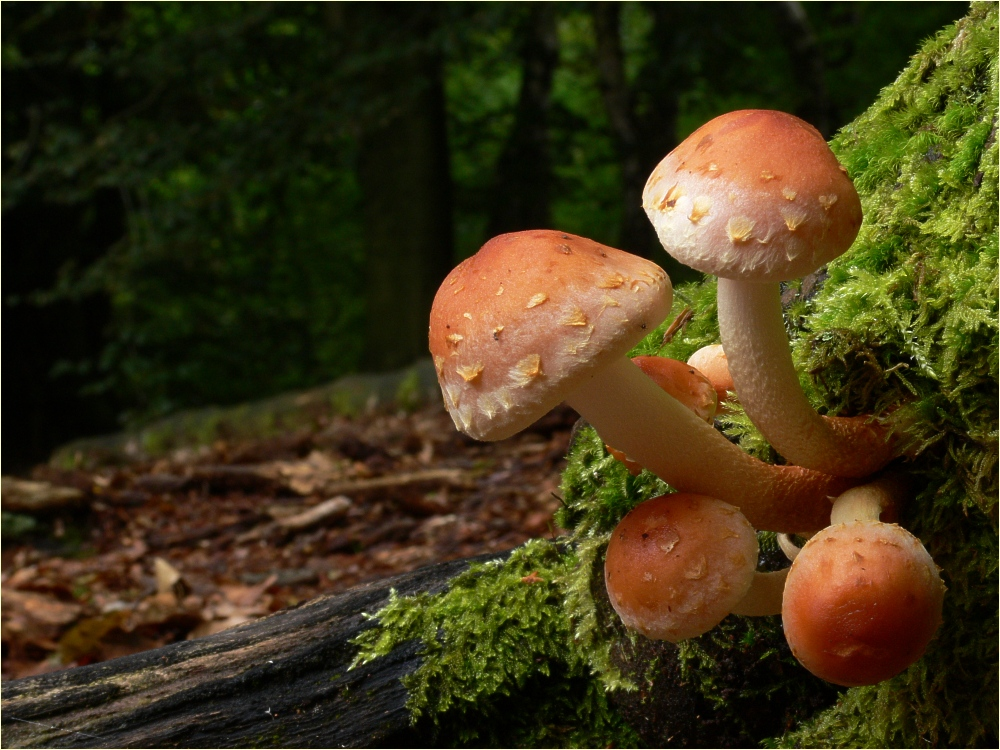

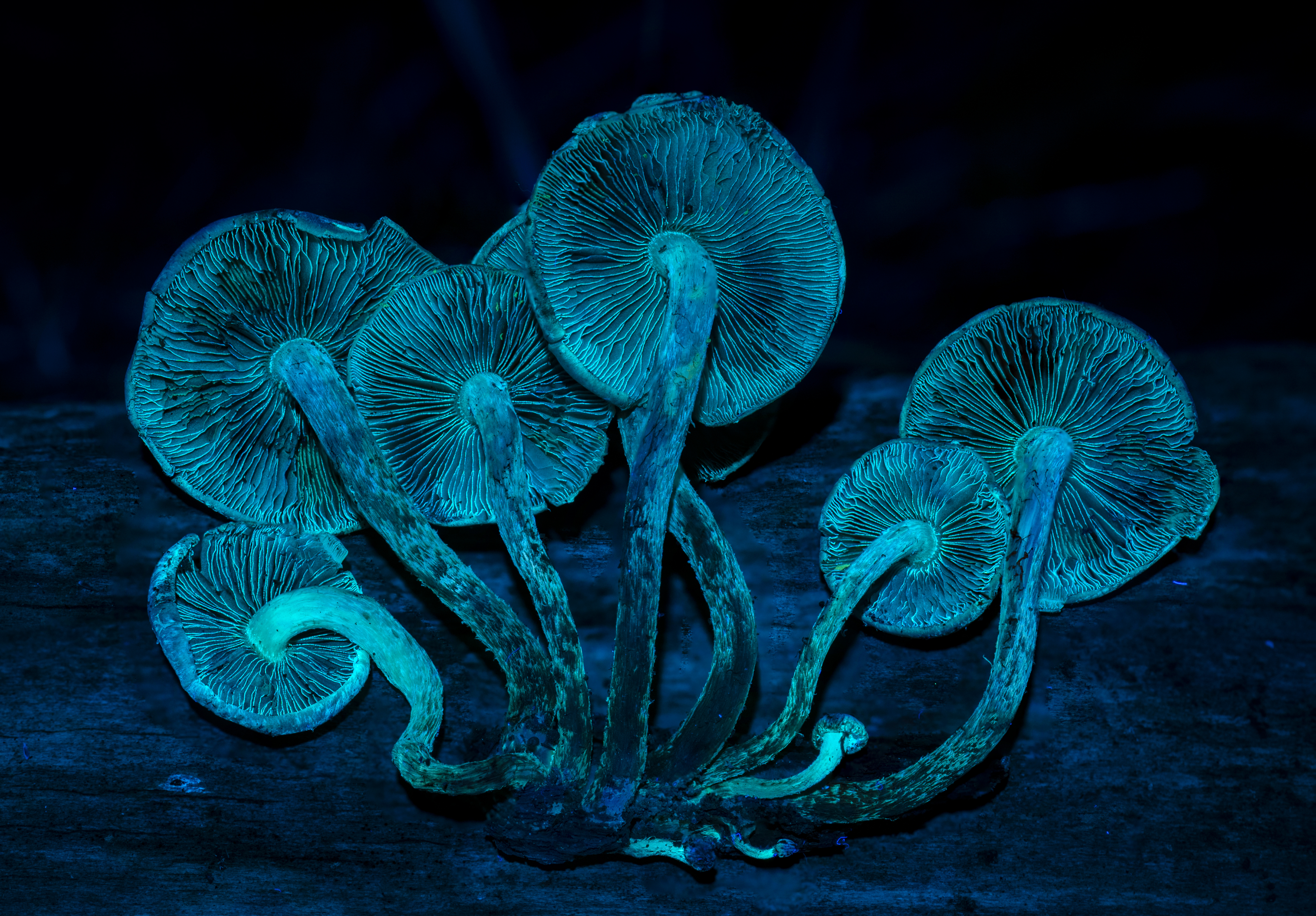

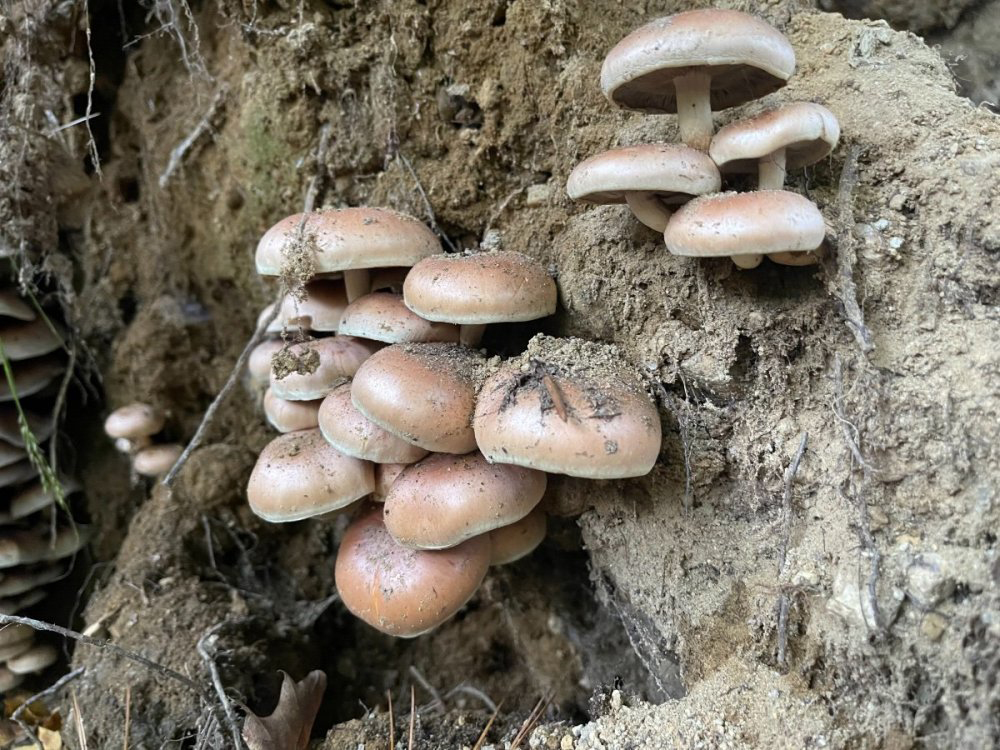
