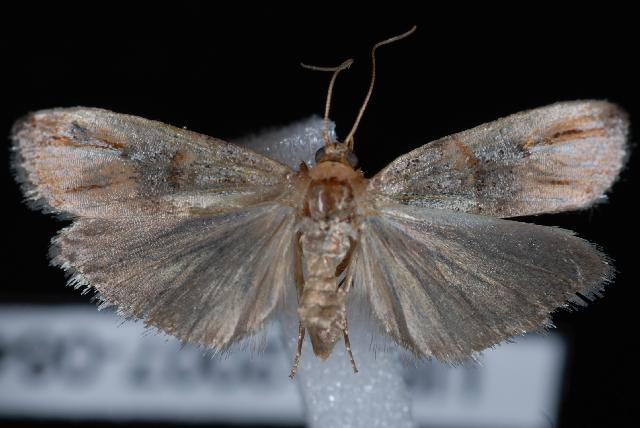

Scientific classification
- Domain: Eukaryota
- Kingdom: Animalia
- Phylum: Arthropoda
- Class: Insecta
- Order: Lepidoptera
- Family: Pyralidae
- Subfamily: Phycitinae
- Genus: Dasypyga; Ragonot, 1887

= Dasypyga =

Genus of moths

Dasypyga is a genus of snout moths. It was described by Ragonot in 1887.

== Species ==
- Dasypyga alternosquamella Ragonot, 1887
- Dasypyga belizensis Neunzig and Dow, 1993
- Dasypyga independencia Neunzig, 1996
- Dasypyga salmocolor Blanchard, 1970
