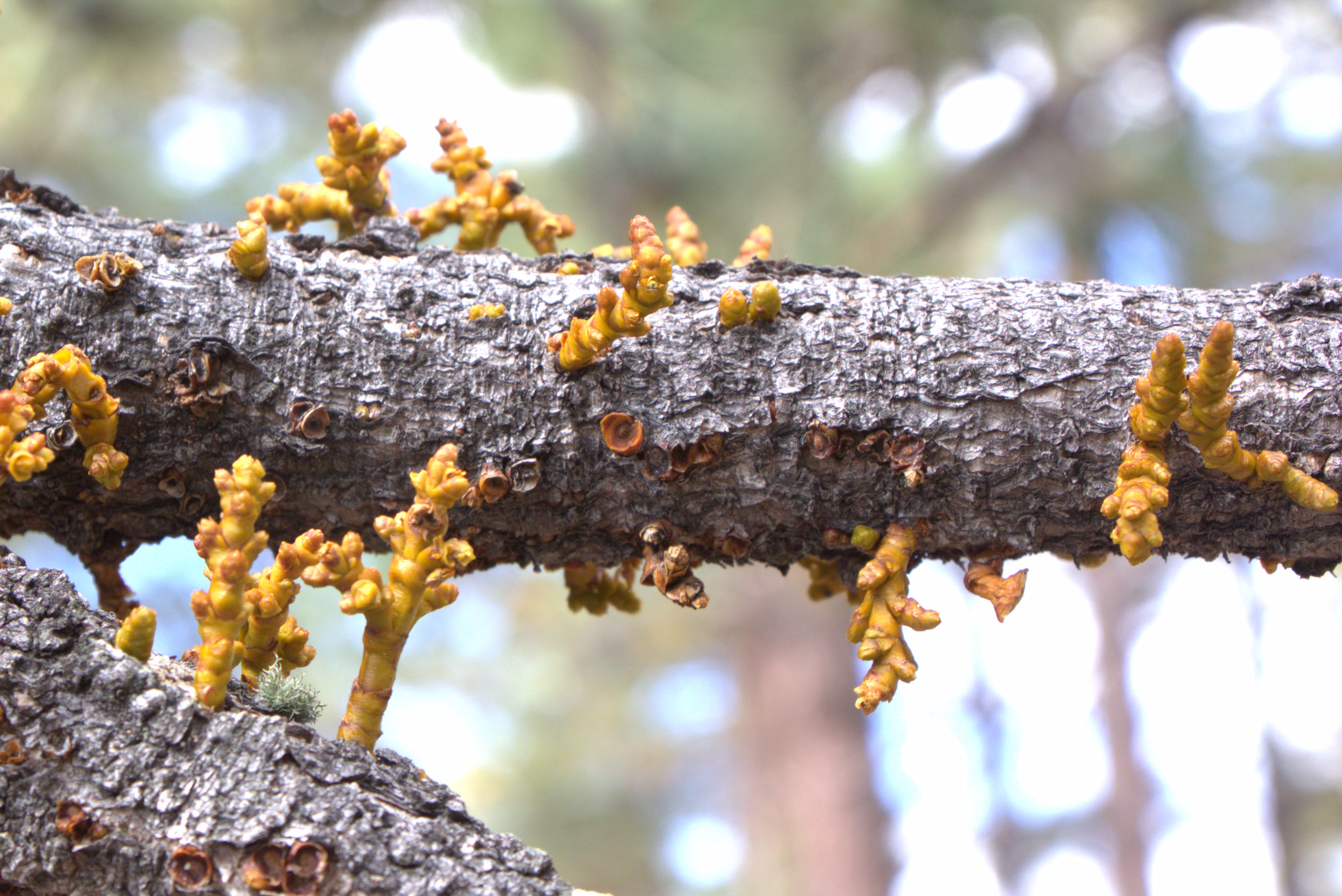

Conservation status
- Secure (NatureServe)

Scientific classification
- Kingdom: Plantae
- Clade: Embryophytes
- Clade: Tracheophytes
- Clade: Angiosperms
- Clade: Eudicots
- Order: Santalales
- Family: Santalaceae
- Genus: Arceuthobium
- Species: A. vaginatum

Binomial name
- Arceuthobium vaginatum (Humb. & Bonpl. ex Willd.) J.Presl

Subspecies
- A. v. subsp. cryptopodum; A. v. subsp. durangense; A. v. subsp. vaginatum

Synonyms
- Arceuthobium cryptopodum; Arceuthobium durangense; Razoumofskya cryptopoda; Razoumofskya mexicana; Razoumofskya vaginata; Viscum vaginatum

= Arceuthobium vaginatum =

Species of dwarf mistletoe

Arceuthobium vaginatum, called the sheathed dwarf mistletoe or southwestern dwarf mistletoe, is a parasitic plant found in the southwestern United States and northwestern and central Mexico. It generally is found on pine trees.

== Taxonomy ==
In 1806 the first classification of Arceuthobium vaginatum was published by Carl Ludwig Willdenow as a species in the Viscum genus named Viscum vaginatum. Willdenow attributed the name to Alexander von Humboldt and Aimé Bonpland. The botanist Jan Svatopluk Presl moved the species to Arceuthobium in 1825 and Otto Kuntze proposed moving it to Razoumofskya in 1891. Together with its genus it is classified in the Santalaceae family and it has three accepted subspecies.

- Arceuthobium vaginatum subsp. cryptopodum – Native to the US from Texas to Utah
- Arceuthobium vaginatum subsp. durangense – Native to northern and southwestern Mexico
- Arceuthobium vaginatum subsp. vaginatum – Native to Mexico, Honduras, and Guatemala

Arceuthobium vaginatum has ten synonyms of the species or one of its subspecies.

Table of Synonyms
Name	Year	Rank	Synonym of:	Notes
Arceuthobium campylopodum var. cryptopodum (Engelm.) Jeps.	1923	variety	subsp. cryptopodum	≡ hom.
Arceuthobium cryptopodum Engelm.	1850	species	subsp. cryptopodum	≡ hom.
Arceuthobium durangense (Hawksw. & Wiens) Hawksw. & Wiens	1989	species	subsp. durangense	≡ hom.
Arceuthobium vaginatum var. cryptopodum (Engelm.) Cronquist	1997	variety	subsp. cryptopodum	≡ hom.
Arceuthobium vaginatum f. cryptopodum (Engelm.) L.S.Gill	1935	form	subsp. cryptopodum	≡ hom.
Arceuthobium vaginatum var. durangense (Hawksw. & Wiens) B.L.Turner	2003	variety	subsp. durangense	≡ hom.
Razoumofskya cryptopoda (Engelm.) Coville	1893	species	subsp. cryptopodum	≡ hom.
Razoumofskya mexicana Hoffm. ex J.Presl	1825	species	subsp. vaginatum	= het.
Razoumofskya vaginata (Humb. & Bonpl. ex Willd.) Kuntze	1891	species	A. vaginatum	≡ hom.
Viscum vaginatum Humb. & Bonpl. ex Willd.	1806	species	A. vaginatum	≡ hom.
Notes: ≡ homotypic synonym; = heterotypic synonym

== Ecology ==
Dense growths of A. vaginatum twigs are favored by Abert's squirrel as a location for nests, due to providing concealment and support.

== Ethnobotany ==
The Ramah Navaho have been documented as using a decoction of Arceuthobium vaginatum as a "ceremonial medicine".
