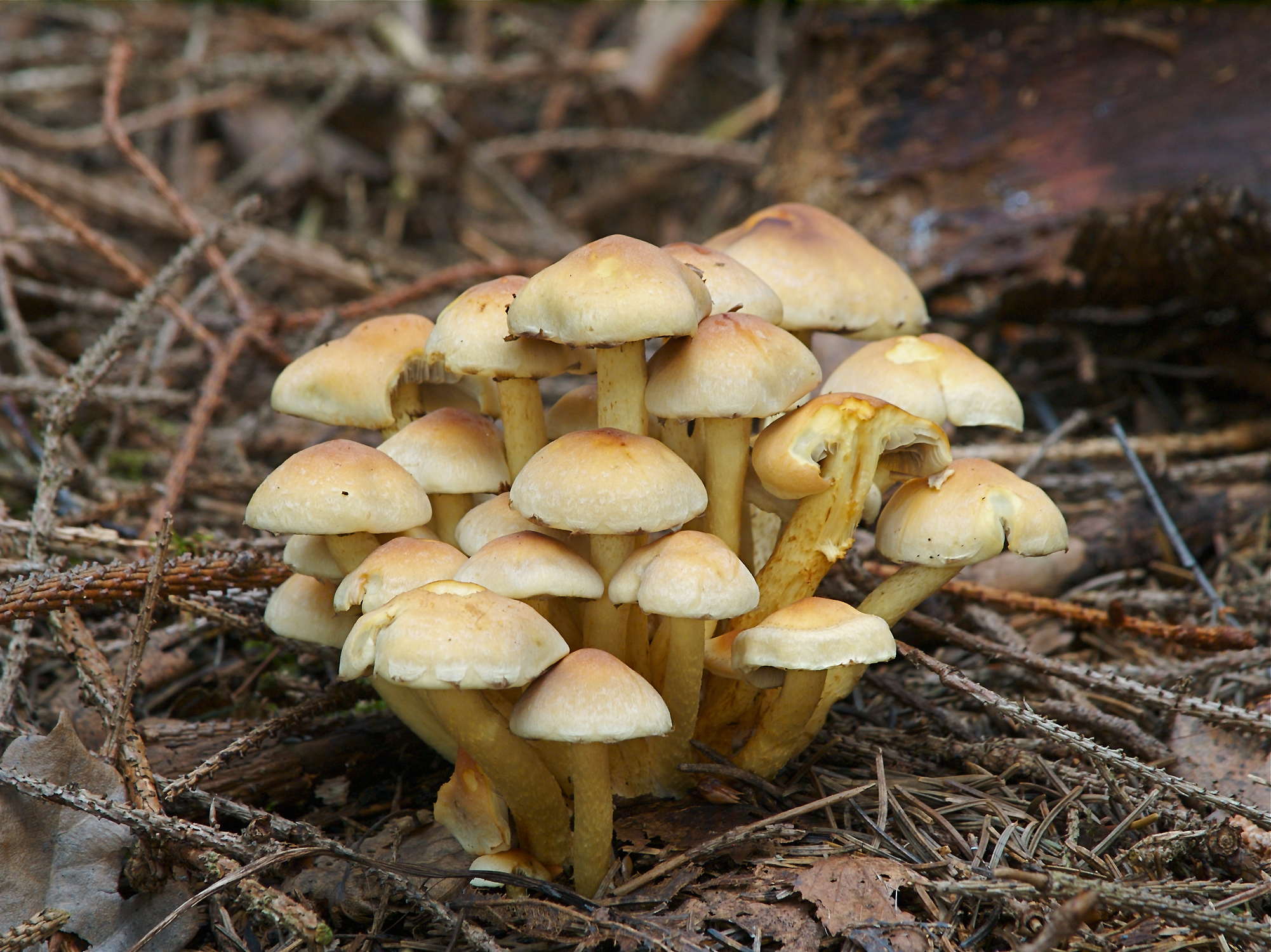
- Hypholoma fasciculare

Scientific classification
- Kingdom: Fungi
- Division: Basidiomycota
- Class: Agaricomycetes
- Order: Agaricales
- Family: Strophariaceae
- Genus: Hypholoma (Fr.) P.Kumm. (1871)

Type species
- Hypholoma fasciculare (Huds.:Fr.) P.Kumm. (1871)

Species
- See text

Synonyms
- Naematoloma P.Karst. (1880)

= Hypholoma =

Genus of fungi

Hypholoma is a genus of fungi which are quite well known due to the commonness of sulphur tuft (Hypholoma fasciculare) on stumps in temperate woodlands. Species in this genus are easily recognizable because the dark spores create a distinctive greenish effect on the yellow cap underside. Hypholoma means "mushrooms with threads" because of the thread-like veil that connects the cap to the stem when young and for the bundles of rhizomorphs which radiate outwards from the stem base. Other well-known species are H. capnoides and H. lateritium.

Fungi of this genus vary in their edibility for humans; some are edible and tasty, some unpalatable, and some outright poisonous. Members of this genus have also been recorded as occasional food of the pleasing fungus beetle Tritoma unicolor.

== Synonyms ==
Sometimes Hypholoma has not been considered a genus in its own right, but it has been grouped together with Stropharia and Psilocybe under the name of Geophila, Naematoloma, or Nematoloma.

== General characteristics ==
- The fruiting bodies mostly have a central stipe. Some are medium-sized and there are also smaller species. The caps range in colour from yellow/brown to brick red.
- The spore colour is dark brown to black.
- The cap is smooth.
- The developing mushroom is enveloped in a veil, but in Hypholoma this can be seen only in very young examples. This means that there is no well-defined ring, and nor are there distinctive flakes on the cap, but there may be cottony ring zones on the stipe, sometimes coloured by the dark spores.
- The genus is widespread throughout the world and its best known representatives grow on dead wood, whilst some others grow in moss, sometimes on moors.

== Species ==
- H. acutum
- H. aporum
- H. australe
- H. australianum
- H. brunneum
- H. californicum
- H. capnoides
- H. castilloi
- H. confusum
- H. dispersum
- H. elongatum
- H. epixanthum
- H. ericaeoides
- H. ericaeum
- H. eximium
- H. fasciculare
- H. flavorhizum
- H. flavovirens
- H. fragile
- H. frowardii
- H. laeticolor
- H. lateritium
- H. litorale
- H. marginatum
- H. murinacea
- H. myosotis
- H. ornellum
- H. peckianum
- H. peregrinum
- H. perplexum
- H. polylepidis
- H. polytrichi
- H. popperianum
- H. puiggarii
- H. radicosoides
- H. radicosum
- H. rickenii
- H. rubrococcineum
- H. solitarium
- H. subdispersum
- H. subericaeum
- H. subviride
- H. vinosum
- H. xanthocephalum

== Gallery ==
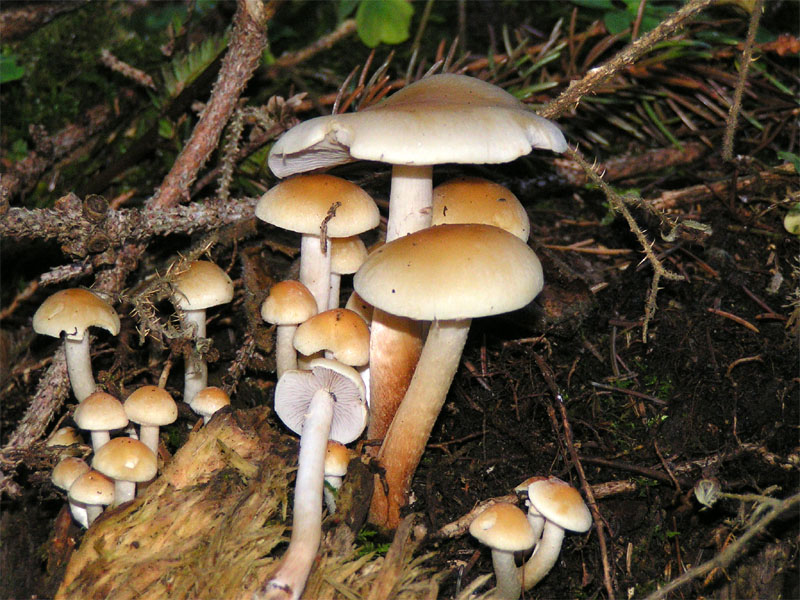
Hypholoma capnoides

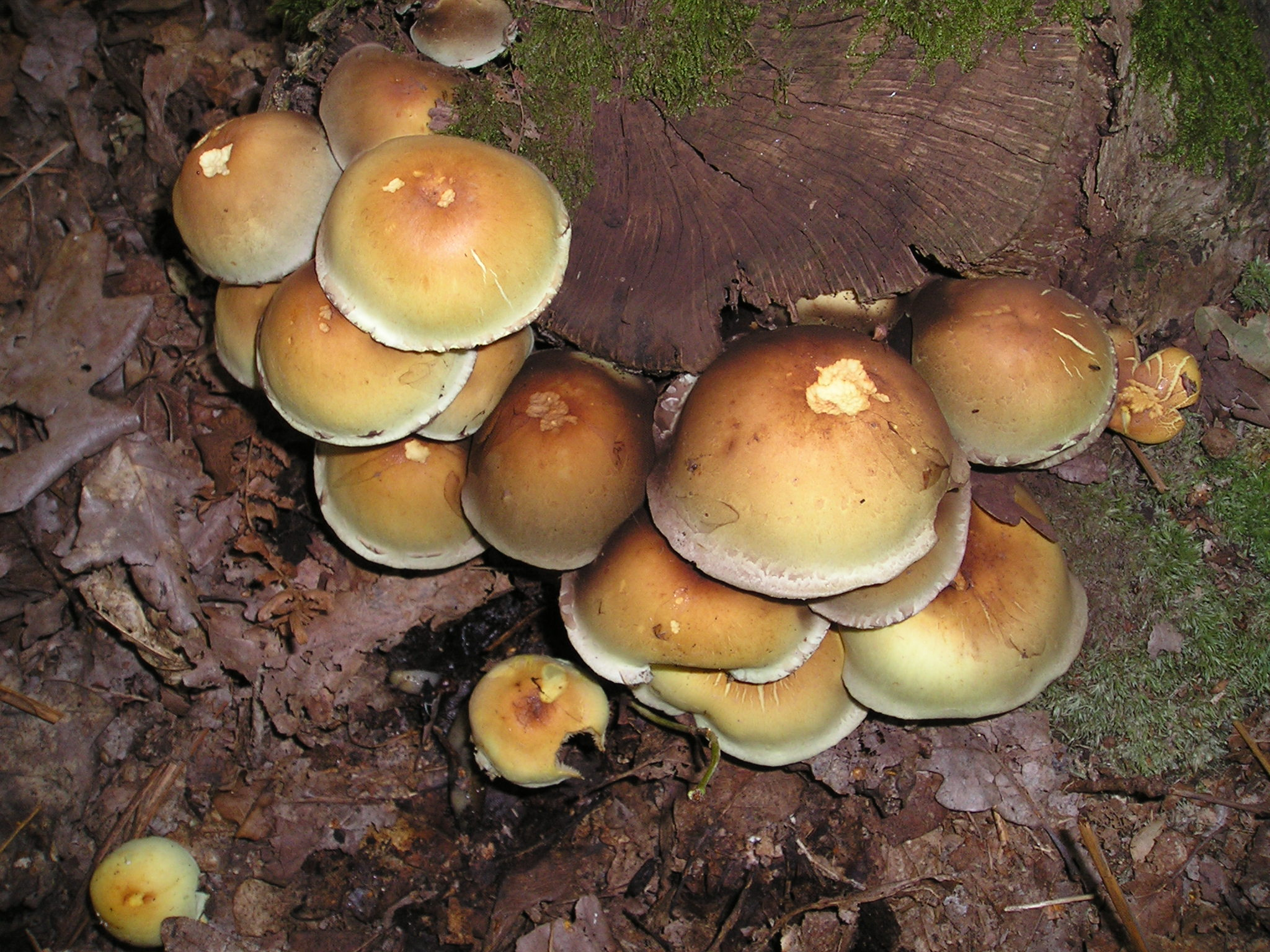
Hypholoma fasciculare

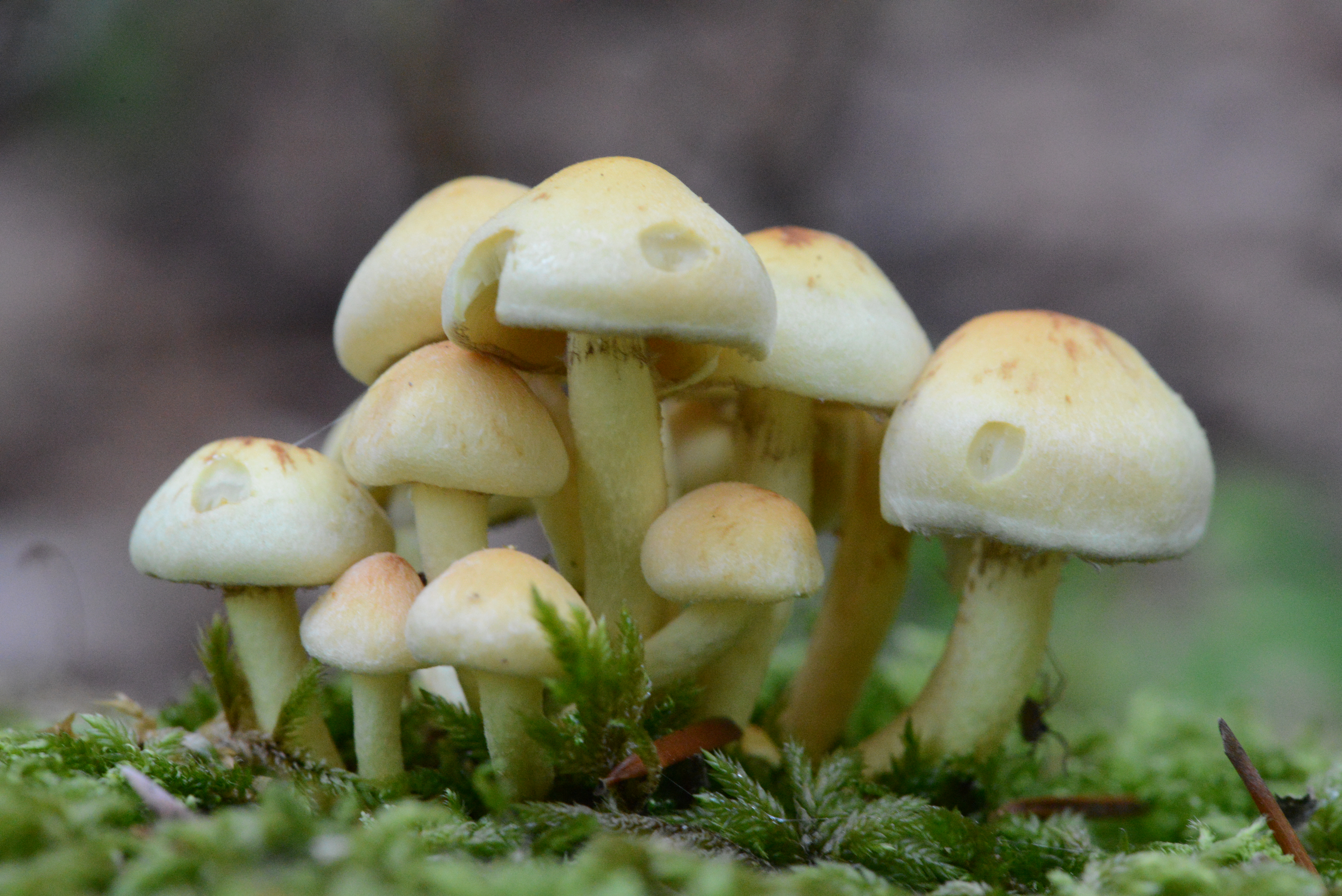
Hypholoma fasciculare

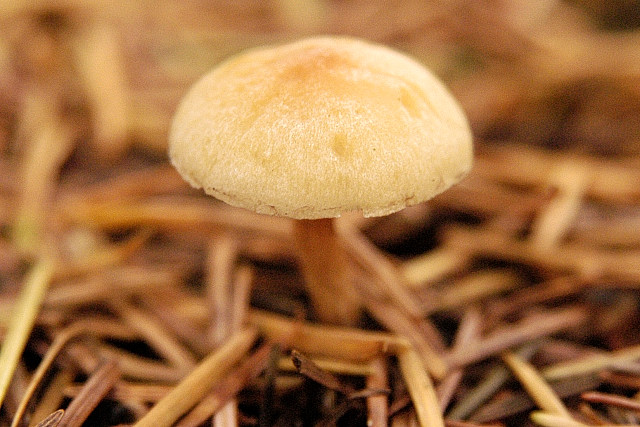
Hypholoma radicosum

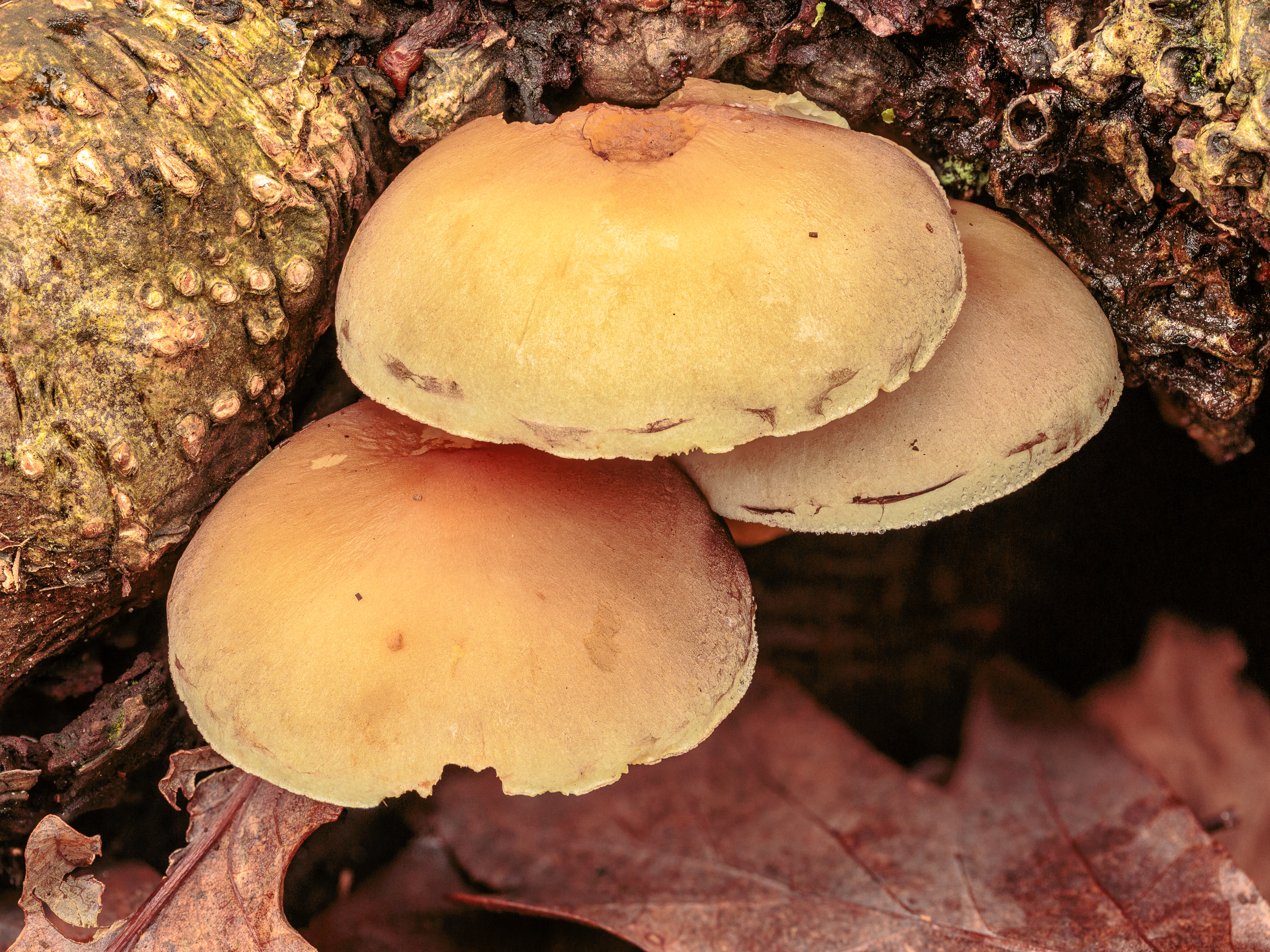
Hypholoma in a deep hole in the crotch of a trunk of an Alder (Alnus).

== See also ==
- List of Agaricales genera
