= Lagenulopsis bispora =

Scientific classification
- Kingdom: Fungi
- Division: Ascomycota
- Class: Eurotiomycetes
- Order: Coryneliales
- Family: Coryneliaceae
- Genus: Lagenulopsis
- Species: L. bispora

Binomial name
- Lagenulopsis bispora (Fitzp.) Fitzp.

Species of fungus

Lagenulopsis bispora is an obligate fungal parasite that infects the leaves of conifers exclusively in the genus Podocarpus. L. bispora is a member of the family Coryneliaceae. It has been reported in Cuba, Fiji, Jamaica, Malawi, Mexico, and Uganda. Less commonly, it has also been found in South Africa.

== Taxonomy and phylogeny ==
This fungus was first described in 1910 by German mycologist Hans Sydow under the binomial name Corynelia clavata f. macrospora. In 1920, American mycologist Harry Morton Fitzpatrick observed significant morphological differences between the asci and ascospores of C. clavata f. macrospora and type species C. clavata (now C. uberata), leading to its reclassification as C. bispora.

Until 1933, all specimens of C. bispora that Fitzpatrick had studied came from Sydow's herbarium in Berlin. The original material was sourced from central Africa in what is now Uganda. That year, Fitzpatrick received additional samples of C. bispora that were found in Jamaica. From observing the more abundant Jamaican material, Fitzpatrick reviewed his classification of C. bispora, described the genus Lagenulopsis, and placed C. bispora within it in 1942. Presently, L. bispora remains the only described species in its genus.

The nomenclature for the genus name Lagenulopsis likely comes from the Latin word "lagena," meaning "flask," or "bottle," referring to the elongated shape of its ascocarp. The species name bispora ("two spores") refers to the presence of only two ascospores per ascus, the feature that first served to most clearly differentiate L. bispora from C. uberata, which typically has eight spores per ascus.

DNA sequencing evidence suggests that L. bispora is basal to Corynelia spp.

== Morphology ==
L. bispora forms small, black, usually subcircular mycelial masses (stromata) on incised margins of its host's leaves. Several can form on one leaf in a scattered pattern. The stromata have occasionally been observed to come together, forming more elongated shapes on their substrate.

The sexual fruiting bodies, also known as ascomata, of L. bispora range from 1–2 mm long, and form in crowded radial clusters, erupting from the stromata. Spermogonia, another type of fungal sexual structure that exclusively produces male gametes, are also present. The spermogonia of L. bispora are ovoid and black, and are smaller than the ascomata. The ascomata are flask-shaped (perithecial), with a small hole called an ostiole at the top of each. The ascomata are shiny and black in color, and are narrower than those of Corynelia spp. The inner walls of these fruiting bodies are made up of an interwoven hyphal layer. Paraphyses, sterile structures that help support the asci inside of the ascomata, are not present. The asci of L. bispora are bitunicate, and initially form with thick outer walls that become thinner as they mature. Each mature ascus invariably contains two ascospores. The ascospores themselves are round to elliptical in shape, typically smooth to slightly bumpy in texture, and are 11-15 μm in diameter. Mature ascospores are dark brown in color.

L. bispora has been more commonly observed in its sexual morph, but there is evidence of an asexual morph for this species as well. Fitzpatrick described in his first account of the species the presence of pycnidia, an asexual fungal reproductive structure, and pycniospores that were "hyaline, yellowish in mass, [and] fusiform." In 2016, Alan R. Wood et al. described pycnidia that were found alongside a Fijian specimen of L. bispora as belonging to an unidentified fungus, but noted their similarity in shape to the ascomata that L. bispora is known to produce.

== Ecology ==
L. bispora was first observed growing on the undersides of live leaves of Podocarpus milanjianus. It has also been found growing on P. latifolius, P. elongatus, and P. matudae. The IUCN currently regards P. milanjianus and P. latifolius as separate species, but evidence now suggests that P. milanjianus and P. latifolius are synonyms of one another. L. bispora does not infect trees of any other genus, and it only parasitizes its host's leaves; it has not been found on stems or fruit. The number of colonies on one leaf usually ranges from 1-10, and colonies of L. bispora and C. uberata can be found existing together on the same tree. Fungi within Coryneliaeceae do not seem to threaten the lives of Podocarpus trees, but their presence does affect the appearance of the leaves that they inhabit.

=== Conservation and relevance to humans ===
While the IUCN does not have data regarding the conservation status of L. bispora, it has been described as rare. Because of its high host specificity, its survival as a species is dependent on the conservation of the few species that it infects. P. milanjianus, P. latifolius, and P. elongatus are species of least concern, but P. matudae is vulnerable. Some species of Podocarpus are used by humans for their medicinal properties, their lumber, or for decoration. P. latifolius is the national tree of South Africa.

C. uberata, which is very closely related to L. bispora, has some historical importance. When it was first collected in 1772, it was one of the first fungal plant pathogens native to South Africa to be described.
