= Caliciopsis arceuthobii =

Scientific classification
- Kingdom: Fungi
- Division: Ascomycota
- Class: Eurotiomycetes
- Order: Coryneliales
- Family: Coryneliaceae
- Genus: Caliciopsis
- Species: C. arceuthobii

Binomial name
- Caliciopsis arceuthobii (Peck) M.E. Barr (1986)

Synonyms
- Sphaeria arceuthobii Peck (1875); Wallrothiella arceuthobii (Peck) Sacc. (1882); Psilosphaeria arceuthobi (Peck) Cooke (1887)

Species of fungus

Caliciopsis arceuthobii, also known as dwarf mistletoe smut, is a species of fungus in the Coryneliaceae family. It parasitizes the pistillate (female) flowers of four species of North American dwarf mistletoes in the genus Arceuthobium. Since mistletoe is itself a parasitic plant, C. arceuthobii is a hyperparasite. Its rough, black fruiting bodies appear near the tips of the mistletoe fruit, whose development it disrupts. Because of its effects on mistletoe populations, which have serious impacts on forest ecology, C. arceuthobii has been considered as a possible biological control agent.

== Description ==
=== Parasitism ===
Caliciopsis arceuthobii grows on and parasitizes four spring-flowering members of the dwarf mistletoe genus, Arceuthobium, namely A. douglasii (its primary host in western North America), A. pusillum (its only host in eastern North America), A. americanum, and rarely A. vaginatum subsp. cryptopodum. Botanist Job Kuijt concluded that reports from the early 1900s of C. arceuthobii parasitizing Arceuthobium abietinum and A. microcarpum represented misidentifications of the host mistletoes, which in both cases were A. douglasii. Mistletoe plants are dioecious, having either male or female flowers, and C. arceuthobii exclusively infects the female flowers and fruits.

Mycologists have hypothesized several potential dispersal mechanisms for the ascospores of C. arceuthobii, including by the splashing of raindrops, wind, and insects. Since the timing of infections by C. arceuthobii coincide with the flowering periods of its hosts, a proposed hypothesis is that insect pollinators of dwarf mistletoes are the primary vectors by which ascospores spread from infected flowers to uninfected flowers.

=== Morphology ===
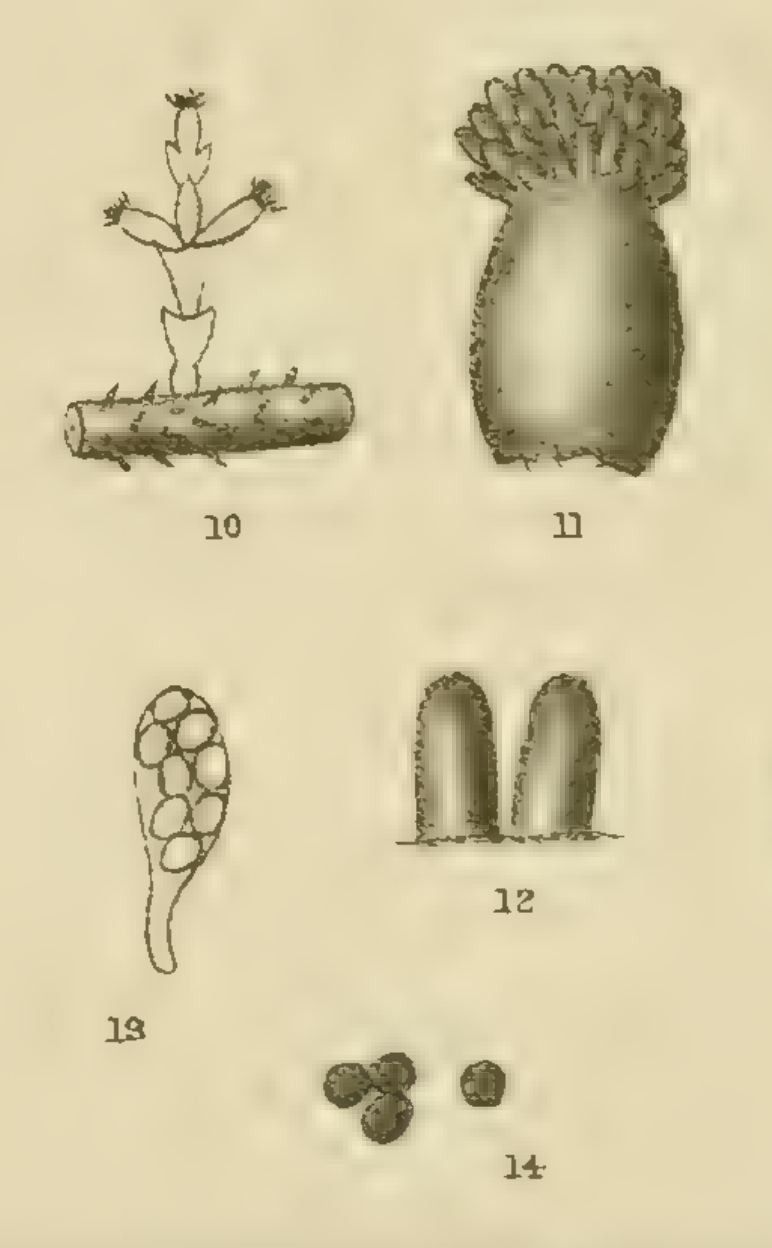
Illustrations accompanying Peck's 1875 description of the species, including an infected mistletoe shoot (Fig. 10), the fungus (Fig. 11), and closeups of perithecia (Fig. 12), an ascus (Fig. 13), and four ascospores (Fig. 14)

A sterile, structural tissue of the fungus called the stroma grows from the stigma of the mistletoe flower downward into the top parts of the fruit and seed. The stroma are brown and 150–246 μm in diameter by 308–540 μm long, with rounded apices. Near the top of the stroma, there are several perithecia, which are flask-shaped structures that hold 16 oblong, spore-bearing cells called asci, each 5–27 μm long and 5–27 μm wide. The number of perithecia in infected Arceuthobium douglasii fruit ranges from 80 to 120, whereas infected fruit of A. americanum contain about 40 perithecia. Each ascus contains 3 single-cellular ascospores, 5–6 μm wide, which are glassy-brown, eventually fading to dull black.

== Taxonomy ==
Charles Peck collected the type specimen of C. arceuthobii in 1873 near Forestburgh, New York, where it was parasitizing Arceuthobium pusillum on Picea mariana. He formally described the species in 1875 as Sphaeria arceuthobii but noted that its placement in Sphaeria was questionable because of the morphology of the perithecia. Later, several new genera were split out of Sphaeria, which is now considered a synonym of the much narrower genus Hypoxylon; in 1882, Pier Andrea Saccardo recombined S. arceuthobii as Wallrothiella arceuthobii, and in 1887 Mordecai Cubitt Cooke recombined W. arceuthobii as Psilosphaeria arceuthobi. Margaret E. Barr again recombined the taxon in 1986, giving it its current placement in Caliciopsis.

== Ecology ==
=== Effects on host plants ===
Infection by C. arceuthobii impacts the health and reproductive rate of the host mistletoe. A four-year study of C. arceuthobii infecting Arceuthobium americanum on lodgepole pine (Pinus contorta subsp. latifolia) found a 58% reduction in annual fruit yield, since infected fruit tend to wither and die. Other studies have found that the severity of C. arceuthobii infections on fruit yield vary, with negligible effects on mistletoes in some years and up to 90% reduction in mistletoe seed yields in other years. In addition to reducing seed yield, C. arceuthobii causes dieback of infected mistletoe shoots.

=== Uses in silviculture ===
Dwarf mistletoes are economically significant because of their detrimental effects on host trees, including decreased growth and vigor and increased mortality, reducing timber yield. For this reason, silviculturists have studied Caliciopsis arceuthobii as a potential biological control agent for reducing the size and spread of mistletoe populations. Mycologists have grown C. arceuthobii in culture and inoculated Arceuthobium douglasii, achieving a 17% infection rate in fruits inoculated with crushed perithecia in water. However, the difficulty of producing large quantities of C. arceuthobii for use as inoculum remains a barrier for efficient use in silviculture. Other pathogens of dwarf mistletoes, including Colletotrichum gloeosporioides and Neonectria neomacrospora have been proposed as more promising fungal biocontrol agents.

=== Associations with other species ===
In his description of the species, Peck noted that a few specimens were parasitized by a small white unidentified mold, found on the perithecia. The yeast Aureobasidium pullulans is also consistently found in the stroma of C. arceuthobii.

== Distribution ==
There are three population systems of Caliciopsis, all in North America within the ranges of its hosts. The fungus is a more common pathogen of its hosts across the western population systems than in the eastern population.

In western North America, there are two population systems of Caliciopsis arceuthobii: a northwestern population and a southwestern population, separated by a gap of approximately 700 miles. In the northwestern population, which extends through much of Oregon, Washington, Idaho, Montana, and British Columbia, C. arceuthobii primarily parasitizes Arceuthobium douglasii and occasionally A. americanum. On A. americanum, this population extends eastward into Alberta and Saskatchewan. The southwestern population ranges through Colorado, New Mexico, and Arizona to western Texas and into Coahuila, with the fungus almost exclusively parasitizing A. douglasii and rarely A. vaginatum subsp. cryptopodum.

The eastern distribution of C. arceuthobii, where it exclusively parasitizes Arceuthobium pusillum, is not as well documented. There are records of C. arceuthobii in New York, Manitoba, and Michigan.

== Conservation status ==
While the conservation needs and status of Caliciopsis arceuthobii have not been assessed in much of its range, NatureServe lists the fungus as vulnerable (S3) in Saskatchewan and Manitoba, Canada.

== Bibliography ==
- Peck, Charles H. (1875). "Report of the Botanist (1873)". Twenty-Seventh Annual Report on the New York State Museum of Natural History (Report). Albany: Weed, Parsons and Company. pp. 73–116.
