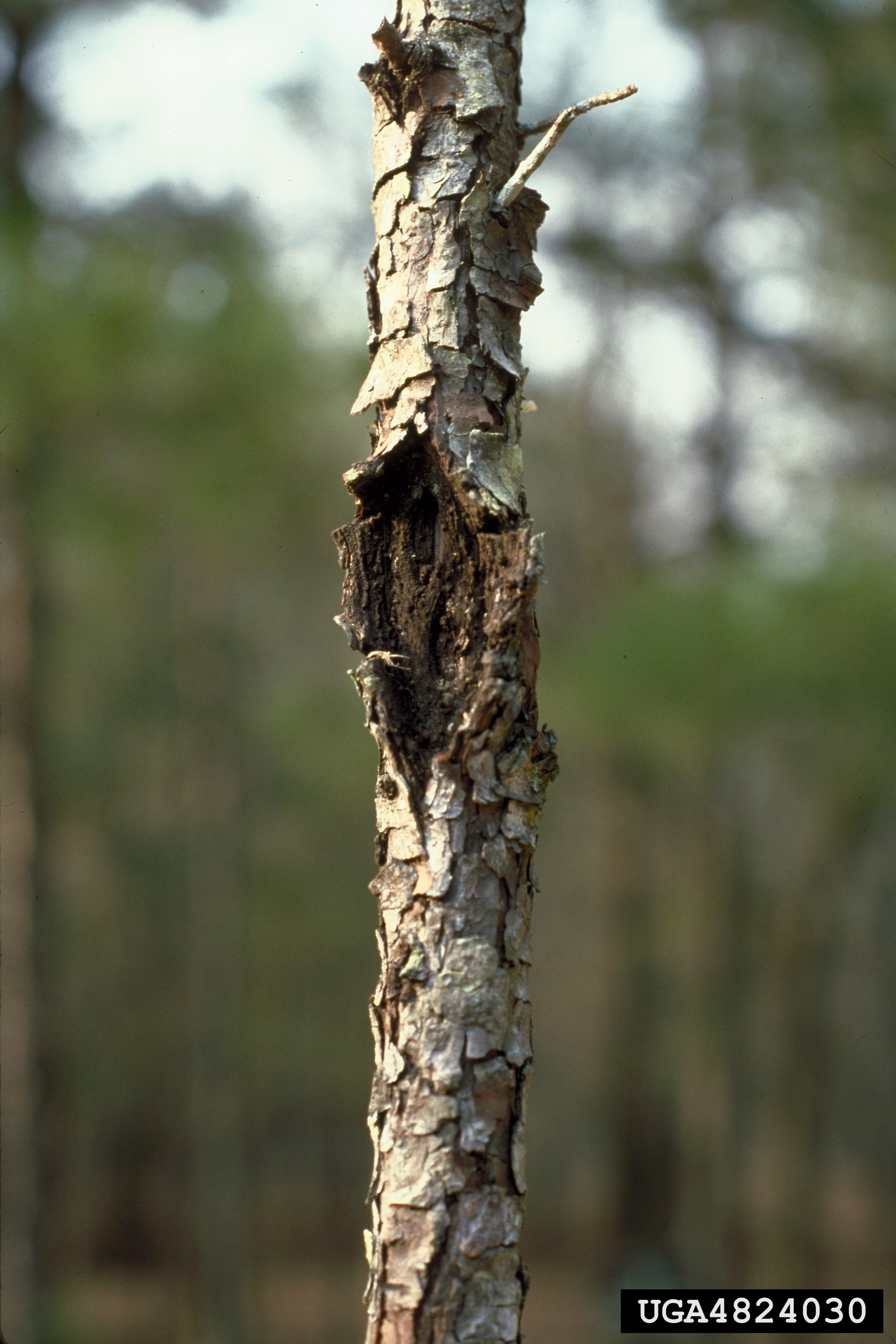
- Caliciopsis canker (Caliciopsis pinea) on loblolly pine (Pinus taeda)

Scientific classification
- Domain: Eukaryota
- Kingdom: Fungi
- Division: Ascomycota
- Class: Eurotiomycetes
- Order: Coryneliales
- Family: Coryneliaceae
- Genus: Caliciopsis
- Species: C. pinea

Binomial name
- Caliciopsis pinea Peck (1883)

= Caliciopsis pinea =

Species of fungus

Caliciopsis pinea, or Caliciopsis pine canker, is a species of fungus in the family Coryneliaceae.

It is most often found on Pinus strobus in New England, New York, Virginia, West Virginia, Quebec and Ontario. It has also been found on Pinus rigida, Pinus pungens, Pinus echinata, Pinus resinosus, and Pinus virginiana in North America. It has also been reported in Europe on Pinus pinaster, Pinus radiata, Pinus pumilo, and Abies species.

The fungus forms an insect/disease complex with white pine bast scale (Matsucoccus macrocicatrices), which causes branch and sapling mortality in Pinus strobus.
