= Hymenium =

Spore-bearing tissue layer in fungi

The hymenium is the fertile, spore-bearing tissue layer of many fungal fruiting bodies. It occurs in both Ascomycota and Basidiomycota, where it is made up chiefly of asci or basidia and often also contains sterile cells such as paraphyses or cystidia. The hymenium usually forms a palisade-like layer of cells extending outward from the supporting tissue on which spores are produced.

In basidiomycete mushrooms and related fungi, the hymenium lines gills, pores, teeth or smooth surfaces; in ascomycetes it may cover the exposed surface of a cup-like fruiting body (apothecium) or line the inside of a flask-shaped one (perithecium). The arrangement of the hymenium was historically central to fungal classification, particularly in Fries's early nineteenth-century separation of fungi with exposed hymenia from those with enclosed spore-bearing tissues, although modern molecular phylogenetics has shown that many broad morphology-based groups evolved repeatedly rather than from a single common ancestor. Microscopic hymenial characters such as the form of cystidia, the structure of paraphyses, and the type of ascus or basidium remain widely used in identification and taxonomy. In lichenised fungi, especially apotheciate lichens, the hymenium is commonly described together with adjacent tissues such as the hypothecium and epithecium.

== Definition ==
The hymenium is the tissue layer in which sexual spores are produced in many ascomycete and basidiomycete fruiting bodies. In a typical hymenium, the spore-producing cells are closely packed into a more or less palisade-like layer, often with interspersed sterile elements. The word derives from New Latin hymenium, from Ancient Greek ὑμένιον (hymenion), a diminutive of ὑμήν (hymēn, 'membrane'). Its earliest recorded use in English dates to 1830. The hymenium is distinct from the hymenophore, which is the larger supporting structure—such as a gill, tube, tooth or smooth surface—on which the hymenium sits. The hymenium is only the thin fertile cellular coating on that structure, not the structure itself.

Not all spore-bearing fruiting bodies have a strongly organised hymenium. In gasteroid basidiomycetes, the fertile tissue develops internally as a gleba rather than remaining exposed, and in some closed ascomata the asci are scattered rather than arranged in a distinct hymenial palisade.

== Structure and associated tissues ==
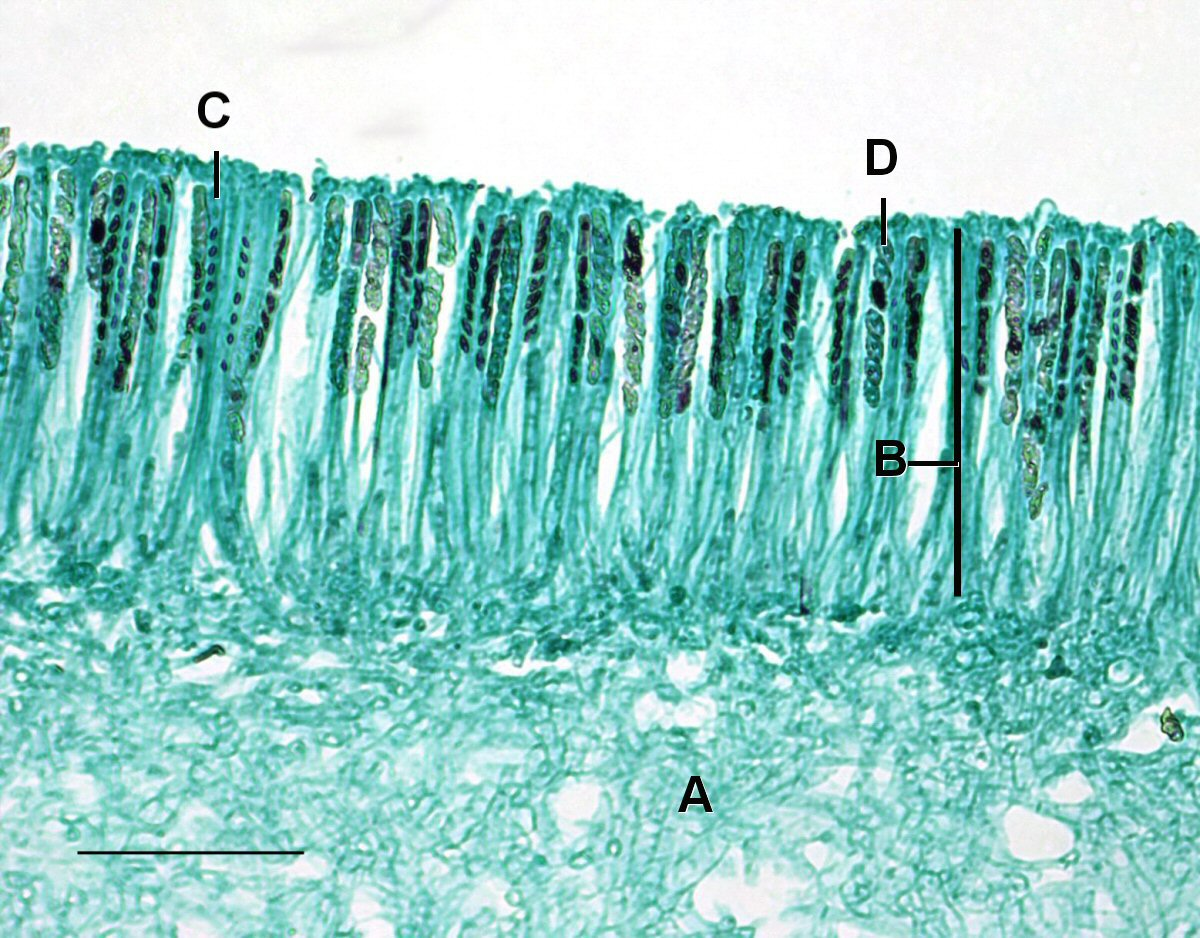
Light microscopy of Peziza showing the hymenial layer with the ascus on the ascocarp mycelium and the ascospores can be seen within the ascus. A=Ascocarp mycelium, B=Hymenial layer, C=Ascus, D=Ascospore. Scale bar = 0.1 mm

In Basidiomycota, the hymenium consists mainly of basidia, usually club-shaped cells that bear basidiospores externally on short projections called sterigmata. Many basidiomycete hymenia also contain basidioles (immature basidia) and sterile elements collectively known as cystidia; cystidia on the gill face are called pleurocystidia, and those on the gill edge cheilocystidia. The term "hymeniform" is also used for any palisade of club-shaped cells arranged like a hymenium, even when the cells are sterile. For example, the cap surface (pileipellis) of some agarics may be described as hymeniform because its cells resemble basidia in shape and arrangement, though they produce no spores.

In Ascomycota, the fertile cells are asci, within which ascospores are formed internally, commonly eight to an ascus. The asci are often interspersed with paraphyses, sterile filaments that arise from the subhymenium and extend upward between the asci. In some groups, especially the Dothideomycetes, the interascal elements are instead pseudoparaphyses, which grow downward from above the locule rather than upward from below, or paraphysoids, which are attached at both ends. The sterile elements within an ascoma are collectively termed the hamathecium in specialist literature.

Beneath the hymenium lies the subhymenium, a layer of supportive hyphae from which the hymenial cells arise (often called the hypothecium in lichenological usage). Below that is the sterile tissue of the supporting structure: in gills, tubes and teeth this is the trama; in many lichen apothecia the tissue enclosing the hymenium laterally is the exciple or excipulum. The organisation of the subhymenium and trama is itself taxonomically informative in many groups.

The uppermost zone of many lichen hymenia is termed the epithecium, the region of paraphysis tips above the asci, which is often pigmented. In lichenological usage, epihymenium is sometimes treated as a synonym of epithecium, but some authors use it more narrowly for a thin layer of interwoven hyphae on the hymenium surface rather than the zone of paraphysis apices, so terminology varies between publications.

== Occurrence and morphology ==
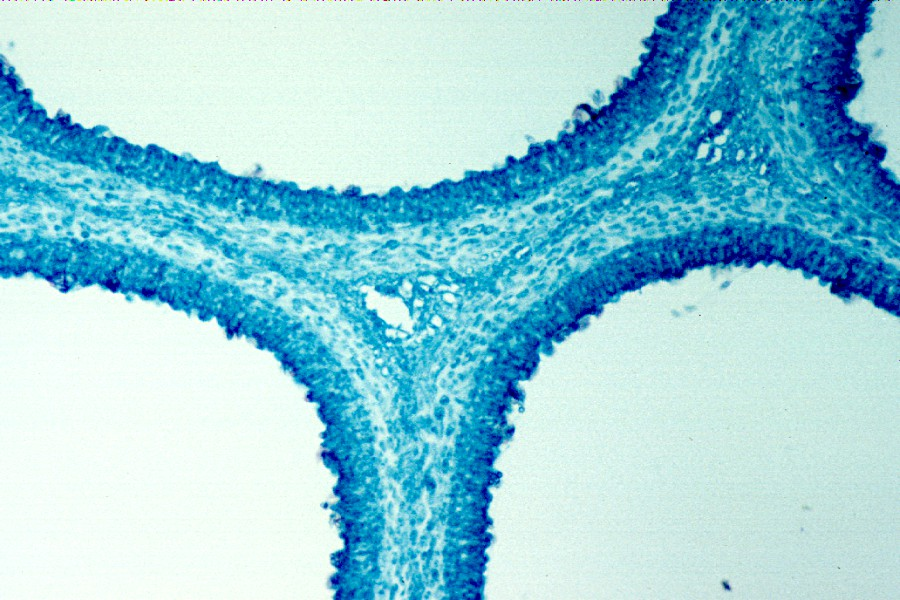
Light micrograph of a cross section of the basidiocarp of a Boletus, showing the hymenium lining the pores

In agarics, the hymenium covers the vertical faces of the gills; in boletes and polypores it lines the inside of tubes that open as pores; in tooth fungi it coats spines or teeth; and in crust fungi it lies on a smooth or wrinkled surface directly applied to the substrate.

In apothecial ascomycetes, such as cup fungi, the hymenium forms the exposed upper surface of the fruiting body. In perithecial ascomycetes it lines the inner wall of a flask-shaped cavity, and the spores are discharged through an ostiole. Closed ascomata may have a reduced or poorly differentiated hymenium, and in ascolocular forms the asci develop in locules within a stroma rather than in a conventional apothecial or perithecial layer.

The same basic concept also applies in lichens, most of which are lichenised ascomycetes. Their apothecia or perithecia contain hymenia built from asci and sterile filaments, but the surrounding tissues and terminology are often described in more detail than in general mycology.

== Development ==
The hymenium may arise by different developmental pathways. The distinction between ascohymenial and ascolocular development was introduced by Nannfeldt in 1932 and elaborated by Luttrell in 1951 and 1955; it became central to later interpretations of ascomycete fruiting bodies.

In ascohymenial development, the ascoma forms after nuclear pairing: the ascogenous hyphae develop first, and the fruiting-body wall then grows around them, producing a true hymenium with true paraphyses. In ascolocular development the sequence is reversed — a stroma forms first, and locules then open within it before the ascogenous system develops, so the asci arise in pre-existing cavities, typically accompanied by pseudoparaphyses rather than true paraphyses.

Modern phylogenetic studies indicate that ascohymenial development is ancestral within the Pezizomycotina, whereas ascolocular development characterises a derived monophyletic clade corresponding to the Dothideomycetes and Chaetothyriomycetidae. The two patterns do not map perfectly onto all modern lineages: for example, some lichenised groups in the Chaetothyriomycetidae, such as the Pyrenulales and Verrucariales, have ascohymenial ontogeny despite being nested within a predominantly ascolocular clade.

In basidiomycetes, the hymenium differentiates from the subhymenial region as the fruiting body matures. Changes in fruiting-body architecture, including repeated evolution of gasteroid and other enclosed forms, can shift when and where the fertile layer develops.

== Function ==
The hymenium is the site of meiosis and sexual spore production. Its arrangement allows large numbers of basidia or asci to be packed into a thin layer while keeping the spore-producing cells exposed to air, or to an internal passage through which spores can escape.

In Basidiomycota, spores are commonly discharged actively from the basidium by the Buller's drop mechanism. The spacing and geometry of gills, pores and other hymenophores are therefore closely tied to the mechanics of spore release. Because the ballistospore mechanism launches each spore less than a fraction of a millimetre from the basidium, gills must be spaced far enough apart, and tube diameters must be wide enough, that discharged spores can fall freely without striking the opposite hymenial surface. In Ascomycota, ascospores are typically expelled from the ascus by turgor pressure, and the form of the ascoma and the organization of its hymenium influence how those spores are released, whether from an exposed cup-like surface or through an ostiole. The mechanism of discharge varies with ascus structure: unitunicate asci, which have a single functional wall layer, typically rupture or open at the tip to release their spores by turgor pressure, whereas bitunicate (fissitunicate) asci have an inner wall that extends through the outer wall before releasing spores, a mechanism especially characteristic of ascolocular groups.

Folds such as gills and pores greatly increase the area available for the hymenium. Lamellate hymenophores provide roughly 25% more spore-bearing surface area than tubular hymenophores of the same cap diameter, and hydnoid (toothed) configurations provide substantially less than either. Comparative studies of basidiomycete fruiting bodies treat hymenophore architecture as a compromise among spore output, protection of the fertile surface and the constraints of development: poroid forms, for instance, shelter the hymenium from rain, wind and invertebrate grazing more effectively than exposed gills.

== History and taxonomic importance ==
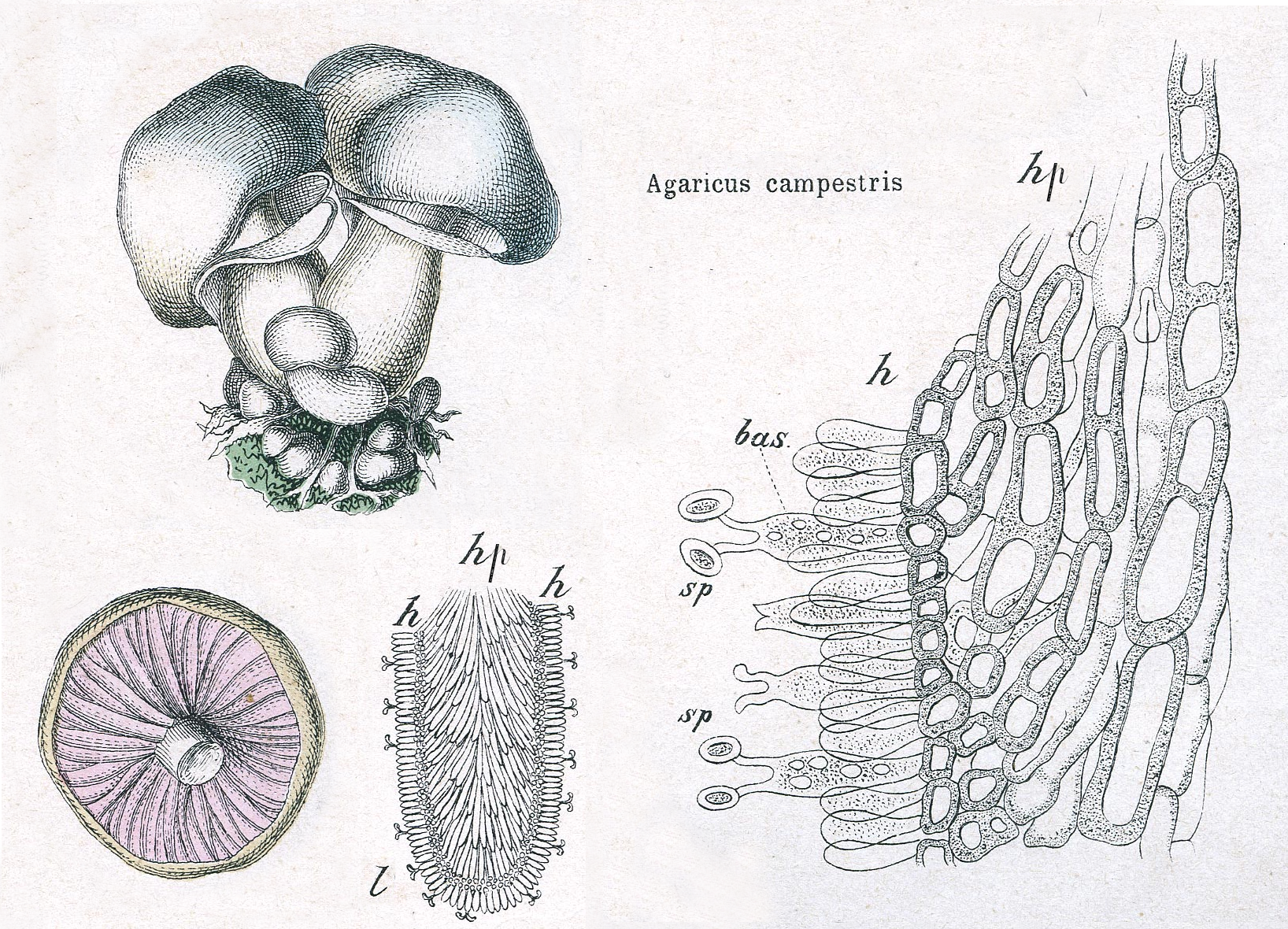
Historical illustration of Agaricus campestris showing the mushroom, a gill cross-section, and microscopic detail of the hymenium with basidia and spores.

The position of the hymenium was one of the principal characters used in early classifications of fungi. In the system established by Elias Magnus Fries in his Systema Mycologicum (1821–1832) and related nineteenth-century schemes, fungi with an exposed hymenium were separated from those with enclosed spore-bearing tissues, giving rise to broad groups such as Hymenomycetes and Gasteromycetes.

The Friesian class Hymenomycetes thus grouped together agarics, polypores, tooth fungi and other basidiomycetes solely on the basis of an exposed hymenium — a grouping that persisted well into the twentieth century. Later workers also used the development and internal organisation of the hymenium to classify ascomycetes. Nannfeldt's 1932 distinction between ascohymenial and ascolocular ontogeny was developed further by Luttrell, whose concept of the Loculoascomycetes linked ascolocular development with bitunicate asci. Molecular phylogenetics has shown that many of these morphology-based groups are polyphyletic. Gilled, poroid, toothed and gasteroid fruiting bodies have each evolved independently multiple times in Basidiomycota, so hymenophore type alone does not reliably indicate close relationship. For example, fungi formerly grouped together as "polypores" on the basis of their poroid hymenophore are now placed in several phylogenetically distinct orders, including the Polyporales and Hymenochaetales.

Even so, hymenial characters remain important in practical taxonomy. Microscopic features such as the form of cystidia, the structure of the subhymenium and trama, the shape of paraphyses, and the nature of the ascus or basidium are still widely used in identification and generic delimitation.

== In lichenology ==
Because most lichen-forming fungi are ascomycetes, lichenologists commonly describe hymenia in apothecia or perithecia. A lichen hymenium usually consists of asci separated by paraphyses, with the hypothecium below and the epithecium above. The surrounding margin may be formed by a proper exciple, a thalline exciple, or both.

Ascus structure within the hymenium is an important microscopic character in lichen taxonomy, and pigmentation of the epithecium and hypothecium is also widely used in identification. Many lichen apothecia are persistent and may remain long after the spores have been dispersed; this should not be confused with ascolocular development, in which asci develop in locules in a stroma.

Lichen terminology partly overlaps with general mycology but is not entirely identical: in particular, the boundary between epithecium and epihymenium is not used consistently by all authors, and the lichenological term hypothecium partly overlaps with the more general mycological term subhymenium.
