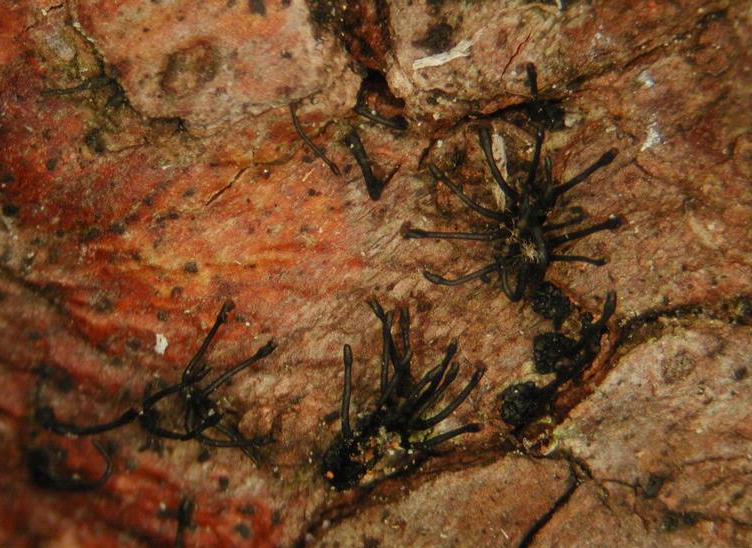
- Caliciopsis pinea growing on Pinus strobus

Scientific classification
- Kingdom: Fungi
- Division: Ascomycota
- Class: Eurotiomycetes
- Order: Coryneliales
- Family: Coryneliaceae
- Genus: Caliciopsis; Peck (1883)

Type species
- Caliciopsis pinea Peck (1883)

Species
- See text

Synonyms
- Capnodium subgen. Capnodiella Sacc. (1882); Sorica Giesenh. (1904); Capnodiella (Sacc.) Sacc. & D.Sacc. (1905); Lagenula G.Arnaud (1930)

= Caliciopsis =

Genus of fungi

Caliciopsis is a genus of fungi in the family Coryneliaceae. It consists of 28 species. These fungi grow as parasites or decomposers on bark, twigs, and leaves of trees, with each species typically restricted to a single host plant. They produce tiny, dark, stalked fruiting bodies that release powdery masses of ascospores from their tips. The genus is found worldwide on both conifers and broad-leaved trees, though many species remain poorly documented due to their small size and hidden growth in bark crevices. One species, which infects dwarf mistletoe species on pines, has been studied as a potential biological control agent.

== Taxonomy ==
The genus Caliciopsis was introduced in 1883 (in a report dated 1880) by Charles Horton Peck for Caliciopsis pinea, a canker-forming ascomycete on eastern white pine. Peck treated it as a stalked discomycete and, as the name suggests, considered it related to the lichen family Caliciaceae, with which it shares narrow, stipitate (stalked) fruiting bodies and a mazaedium of dry, powdery ascospores. Later, Ellis and Everhart erected the genus Hypsotheca for several similar fungi but placed them with Pyrenomycetes in the Ceratostomeae; Rehm subsequently recognised that Hypsotheca and Caliciopsis were the same genus, retained the name Caliciopsis, and, like Saccardo, continued to place the group in the Caliciaceae within the discomycetes.

During the early twentieth century the genus was repeatedly shifted between higher taxa. Von Höhnel was the first to suggest transferring Caliciopsis to the Coryneliaceae, a family then segregated for the genera Corynelia and Tripospora. Fitzpatrick later placed Caliciopsis in the Coryneliaceae (initially within the Perisporiales—an assemblage now considered artificial and abandoned in modern classifications—and later in the Dothideales), largely on the basis of its erumpent stromata and apically dehiscent, mazaediate ascocarps, an interpretation reinforced by McCormack's developmental study of C. pinea, which treated the ascigerous cavity as a stromatic locule. Subsequent work by Luttrell, however, showed that Coryneliaceae asci are unitunicate rather than bitunicate, and he removed the family from the Loculoascomycetes, leaving its higher placement unresolved.

Funk's detailed study of development, morphology and life cycle in three canker-forming species (C. pinea, C. pseudotsugae and the newly described species C. orientalis on eastern hemlock) re-examined these relationships. He showed that the stalked ascocarps of Caliciopsis arise from small, erumpent stromata, that female structures consist of dark ascogonial hyphae which put out trichogyne-like receptive hyphae, and that clusters of ascogonia give rise to an ascogenous system bearing long-stalked asci; closely homologous stages were then demonstrated in several calicioid lichens (Caliciaceae) and in members of the Coryneliaceae. On this basis, Funk argued that Caliciopsis is best regarded as a non-lichenised member of the Caliciaceae within the order Caliciales, and that the Coryneliaceae should also be treated as a family of Caliciales rather than as dothidealean loculoascomycetes. Later studies have instead classified Coryneliaceae in the order Coryneliales within the class Eurotiomycetes, distinct from the lichen-forming Caliciaceae.

== Description ==
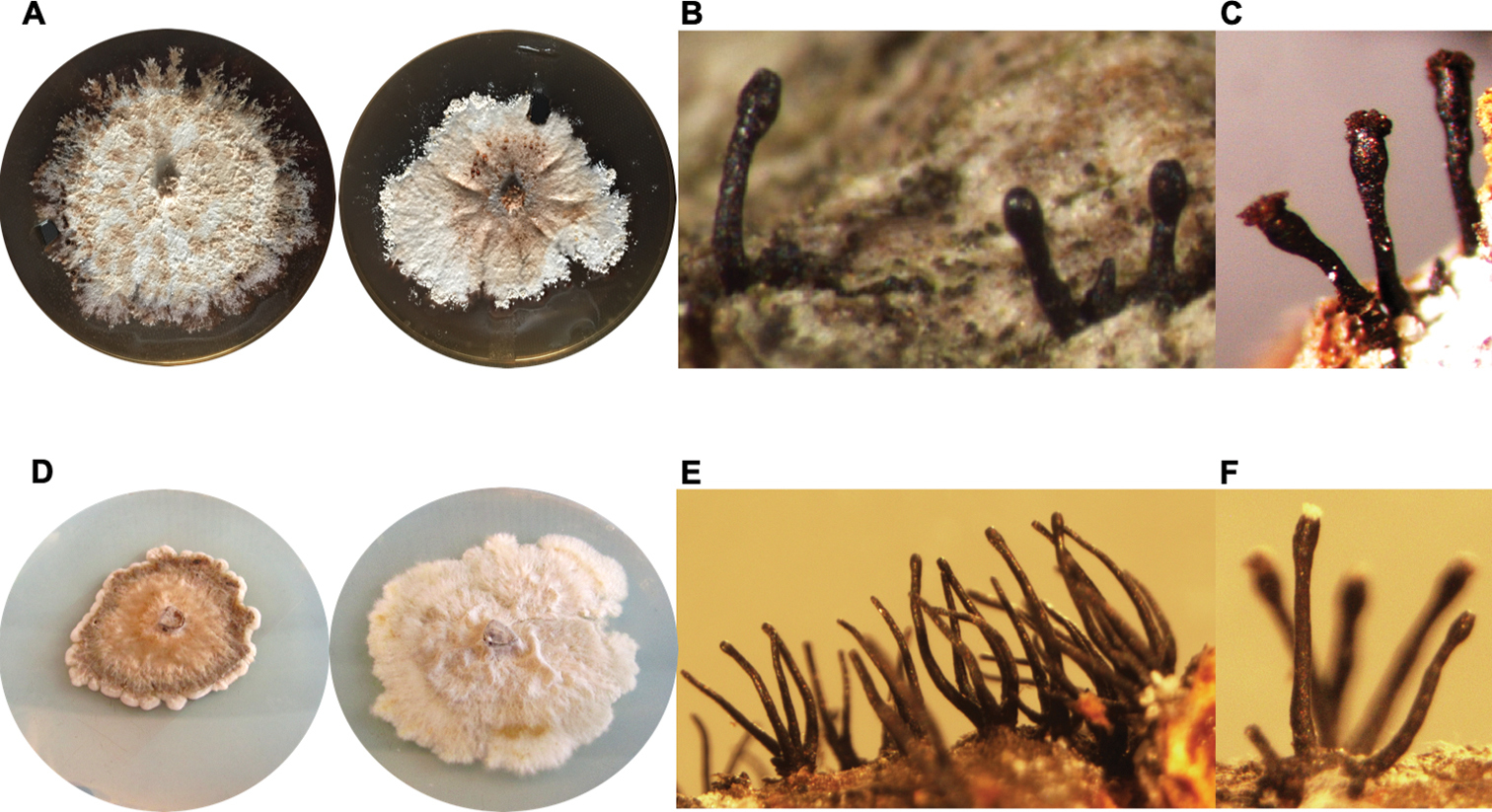
Caliciopsis moriondi (A–C) and C. pinea (D–F). A, D: four-week-old colonies on malt extract agar at 20 °C; B, C, E, F: ascomata on cankers of Pinus radiata. Caliciopsis moriondi is shown for comparison, but the name was invalidly published and is not treated as an accepted species.

Caliciopsis species produce minute, dark fruiting bodies that develop on the bark, leaves, or needles of woody hosts. In many taxa the fungus first forms a shallow stroma, a thin pad of fungal tissue just under or on the surface of the host, from which both sexual fruiting bodies (ascocarps) and tiny male structures (spermogonia) arise. The ascocarps are typically stalked, with a narrow stipe that lifts a swollen, spindle-shaped central region containing the spore-bearing cavity, and an apical beak that opens by a small pore. In some foliar species, such as those on conifer needles, the ascocarps arise directly from the host surface and no obvious stroma is visible. Individual stromata may carry one or many ascocarps, which in some species form dense groups of black, urn-shaped structures.

Internally, the fruiting bodies conform to the characteristic structure of the order Coryneliales. The spore-bearing region (centrum) consists of a lysigenous cavity lined by long-stalked asci, with no paraphyses between them, and the asci dissolve as the spores mature to leave a dense mass of free ascospores. The walls of the ascocarps show a distinctive construction: examined species have a core of intricately interwoven hyphae (termed textura intricata) sheathed in a thin outer layer of more regular, angular or prismatic cells. In some species this internal tissue is strongly gelatinous, and can be teased out as a soft, translucent core. The apex of the ascocarp often becomes packed with ascospores, forming a powdery plug that is exposed at dehiscence and from which the spores are dispersed by wind or rain.

Ascospores of Caliciopsis are generally small, with most species producing eight spores per ascus. They range from roughly spherical (globose) to ellipsoidal or narrowly spindle-shaped (fusiform), and their outer walls show a variety of surface patterns under high magnification, from smooth to finely pitted, rugose, or distinctly foveolate. These differences in spore shape and ornamentation, together with ascocarp size, the position of the ascigerous cavity within the fruiting body, and the presence or absence of a visible stroma, provide important characters for distinguishing species within the genus.

== Habitat and distribution ==
Caliciopsis species grow on living or dead tissues of vascular plants, usually as highly host-specific parasites or saprobes. They are most often found on bark, twigs, or overgrown tissues produced around cankers, and in some cases on specialised structures such as dwarf mistletoe species or insect galls. For example, one species develops on wasp galls on oak twigs and Caliciopsis arceuthobii infects the shoots and fruits of lodgepole pine dwarf mistletoe, where it has been evaluated as a potential biological control agent. Across the genus, hosts range from conifers (including pines, cypresses and podocarps) to broad-leaved trees such as oaks, poplars, holm oak and various tropical trees, and individual species are typically associated with a single host genus.

The genus has been recorded from temperate parts of North and South America and Eurasia, as well as from tropical regions, but detailed distribution data are still lacking for many species. In Europe only a small number of taxa are known with certainty, including species on conifers and junipers with distributions on both sides of the Atlantic and bark-inhabiting species on holm oak.

At the stand scale, Caliciopsis fruiting bodies are often inconspicuous and can be hidden deep in bark fissures or beneath loose bark. Iberian populations on Quercus ilex subsp. rotundifolia, for instance, frequently develop within narrow trunk crevices and only occasionally emerge on the outer bark surface, where they can be intermingled with epiphytic lichens from families such as Lecanoraceae, Teloschistaceae and Physciaceae. This cryptic habit, together with the small size of the stromata and ascocarps, is thought to be one reason why the genus remains under-recorded despite a relatively wide geographical and host range.

== Species ==
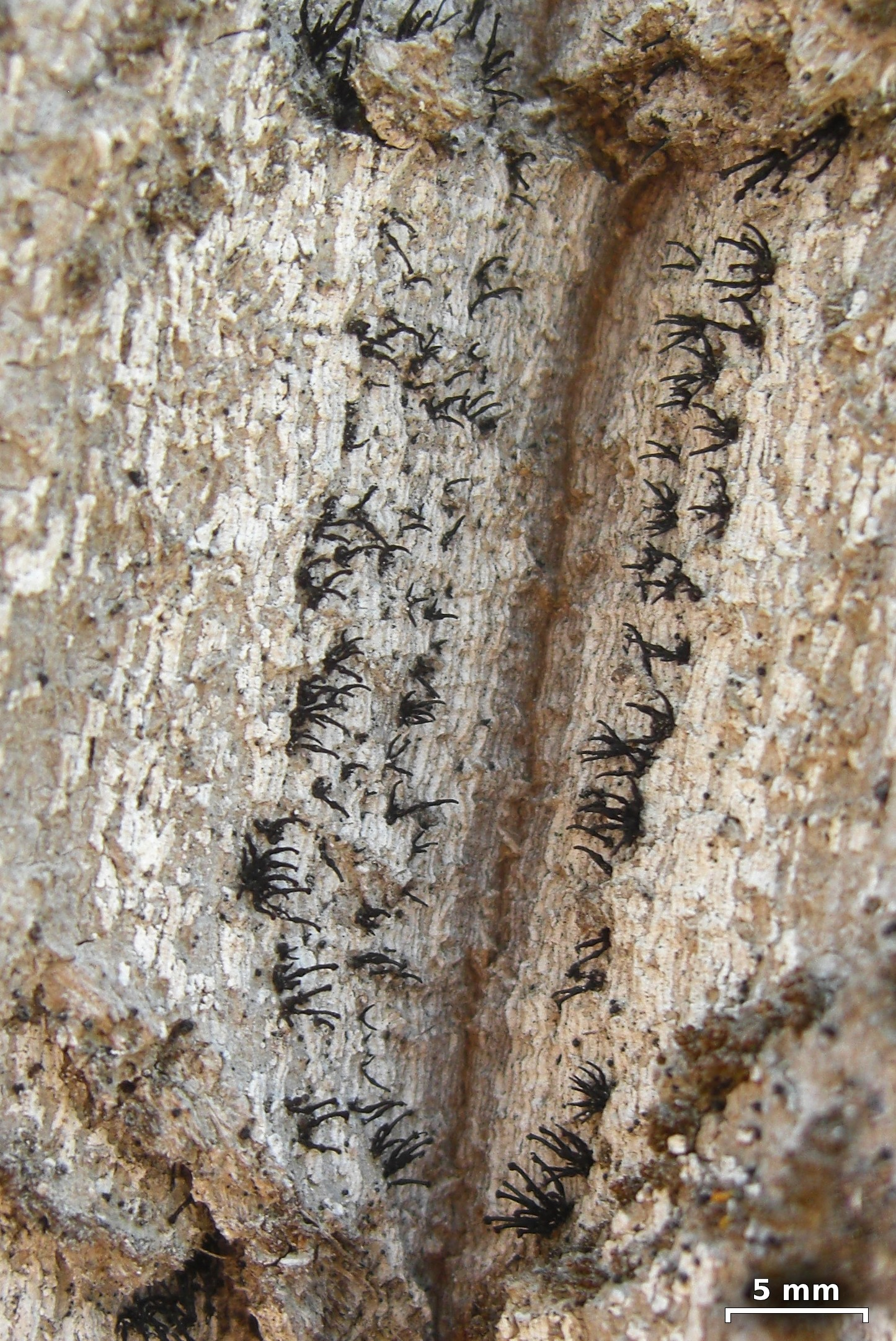
Caliciopsis (not identified to species) growing on Populus trichocarpa, in Wells Gray, British Columbia, Canada

As of November 2025, Species Fungorum (in the Catalogue of Life) accept 28 species of Caliciopsis:

- Caliciopsis arceuthobii (Peck) M.E.Barr (1986)
- Caliciopsis arrhiza (Pat. & Gaillard) Bat. & J.L.Bezerra (1964)
- Caliciopsis beckhausii (Körb.) Garrido-Ben. & Pérez-Ort. (2015)
- Caliciopsis brevipes Butin (1970)
- Caliciopsis clavata (Lév.) Fitzp. (1942)
- Caliciopsis cochlearis Butin (1970)
- Caliciopsis confusa Bat. (1956)
- Caliciopsis elytranthicola Hansf. (1957)
- Caliciopsis eucalypti Crous (2016)
- Caliciopsis indica J.Pratibha & Bhat (2010)
- Caliciopsis myrticola B.Huguenin (1969)
- Caliciopsis orientalis A.Funk (1963)
- Caliciopsis pinea Peck (1883)
- Caliciopsis podocarpi B.Huguenin (1969)
- Caliciopsis pseudotsugae Fitzp. (1942)
- Caliciopsis quercina Marm. (1999)
- Caliciopsis rapaneae B.Huguenin (1969)
- Caliciopsis rhoina Rikkinen (2000) – China
- Caliciopsis sambaibae J.L.Bezerra, M.P.Melo & Beserra (2020)
- Caliciopsis struthanthi A.Funk & Kuijt (1974)
- Caliciopsis symploci Fitzp. (1942)
- Caliciopsis tiliae (G.Arnaud) G.Arnaud (1930)
- Caliciopsis toonae Rikkinen (2000) – China
- Caliciopsis uredinicola (Kuhlman, J.W.Carmich. & T.Mill.) Z.Yuan Zhang (2025)
- Caliciopsis valentina Garrido-Ben. & Pérez-Ort. (2015)
- Caliciopsis veillonii B.Huguenin (1969)
- Caliciopsis ventricosa (Ach.) Tibell (1987)
- Caliciopsis xanthostemonis B.Huguenin (1969)
