= Pewenomyces =

Scientific classification
- Domain: Eukaryota
- Kingdom: Fungi
- Division: Ascomycota
- Class: Eurotiomycetes
- Order: Coryneliales
- Family: Coryneliaceae
- Genus: Pewenomyces; F. Balocchi, I. Barnes & M.J. Wingfield 2021

Type species
- Pewenomyces kutranfy Balocchi, I. Barnes & M.J. Wingf

Genus of fungi

Pewenomyces is a genus of fungi in the family Coryneliaceae. The genus was first described in 2015 in Chile growing as canker pathogen on monkey puzzle trees and the species was named Pewenomyces kutranfy.

At the time of describing P. kutranfy, there was uncertainty regarding its novelty because two species of Caliciopsis (C. brevipes and C. cochlearis), a closely related genus in the Coryneliaceae, had previously also been described from the same host and location, but for which DNA sequence data were not available. A follow-up study used phylogenetic analysis for three potential Pewenomyces species found in samples taken from host trees confirmed that they were distinct species.

== Species ==
There are currently 4 described species of Pewenomyces.

- Pewenomyces kutranfy
- Pewenomyces lalenivora
- Pewenomyces tapulicola
- Pewenomyces kalosus
