= Fitzpatrickella operculata =

Scientific classification
- Domain: Eukaryota
- Kingdom: Fungi
- Division: Ascomycota
- Class: Eurotiomycetes
- Order: Coryneliales
- Family: Coryneliaceae
- Genus: Fitzpatrickella; Benny, Samuelson & Kimbr. (1985)
- Species: F. operculata

Binomial name
- Fitzpatrickella operculata Benny, Samuelson & Kimbr. (1985)

Species of fungus

Fitzpatrickella operculata is an ascomycete species of fungus from the order Coryneliales. It grows exclusively on the fruits of the Drimys genus of flowering plants on the Juan Fernández Islands. This fungus was named after Harry Morton Fitzpatrick, a mycologist involved in the study of Coryneliales. It is the only species in the genus Fitzpatrickella .

== Description ==
Fitzpatrickella operculata is characterised by the presence of doliiform, black ascocarps with an obvious area for dehiscence to occur. The ascocarps of Fitzpatrickella operculata tend to almost cover the fruits they infect being very tightly packed, with the ascocarps having well defined operculum, that when ruptured to release the ascospores leaves a central cavity in the ascocarp. The central cavity is lined with a zone of textura prismatica (tissue composed of relatively short cylindrical cells), and an outer layer of textura angular (tissue composed of tightly packed polyhedral cells).

Fitzpatrickella operculata generally produces eight spored asci, containing brown to dark brown pitted ascospores of varying shapes, which are also unicellular spores.
