= Lagenulopsis =

Scientific classification
- Kingdom: Fungi
- Division: Ascomycota
- Class: Eurotiomycetes
- Order: Coryneliales
- Family: Coryneliaceae
- Genus: Lagenulopsis; Fitzp.

Genus of fungi

Lagenulopsis is a monotypic genus of small, parasitic fungi within Coryneliaceae that live in tropical climates. Lagenulopsis exhibits high host specificity; it has only been observed growing on the leaves of Podocarpus trees. Its type species is Lagenulopsis bispora.

This genus was first described in 1942 by Harry Morton Fitzpatrick. Fitzpatrick received new material of the species then known as Corynelia bispora in 1933, reviewed his classification of it, and then founded Lagenulopsis on morphological differences between it and Corynelia. This placed L. bispora into its current genus.
