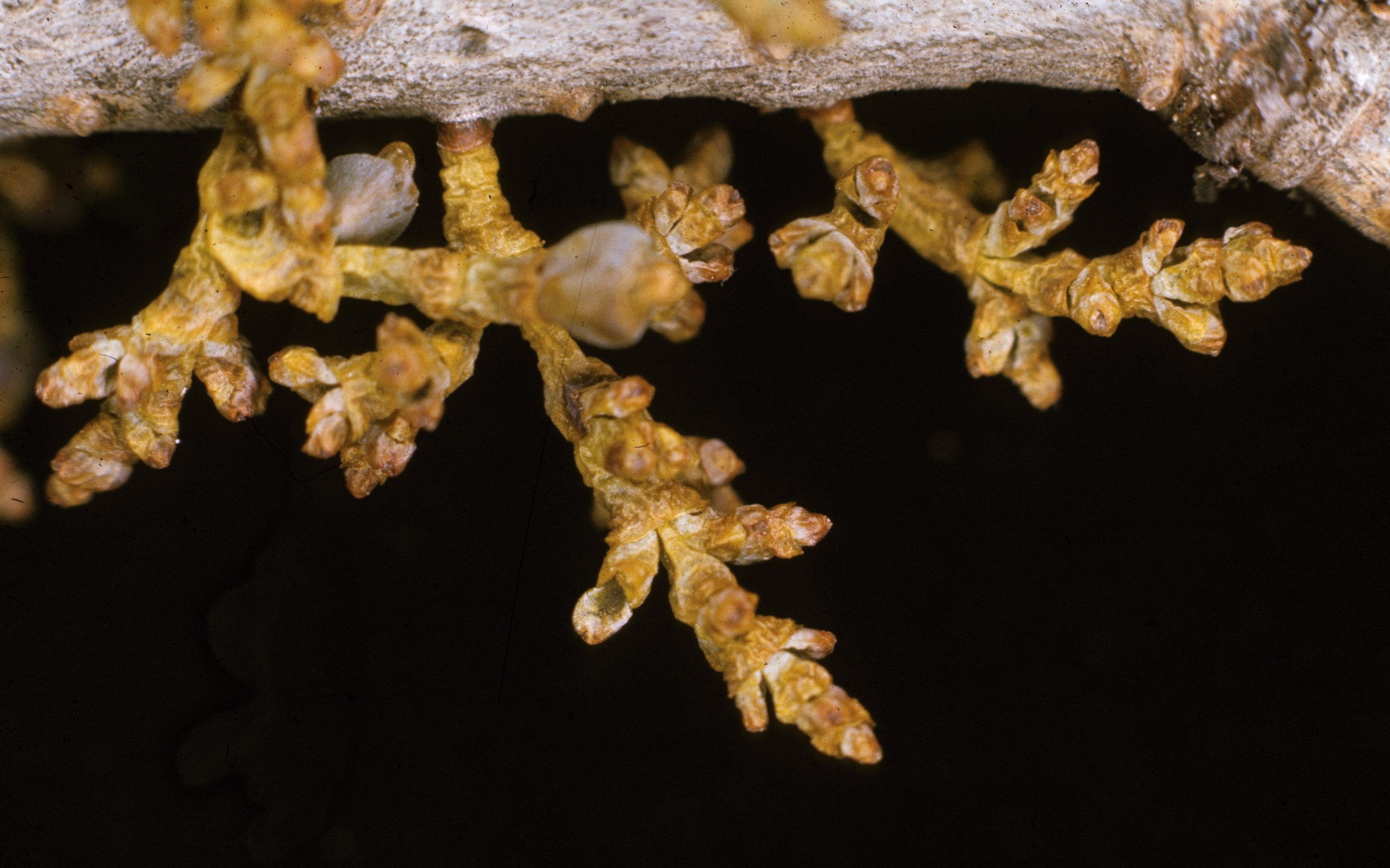

Conservation status
- Secure (NatureServe)

Scientific classification
- Kingdom: Plantae
- Clade: Embryophytes
- Clade: Tracheophytes
- Clade: Angiosperms
- Clade: Eudicots
- Order: Santalales
- Family: Santalaceae
- Genus: Arceuthobium
- Species: A. douglasii

Binomial name
- Arceuthobium douglasii Engelm.

Synonyms
- Razoumofskya douglasii Kuntze

= Arceuthobium douglasii =

Species of dwarf mistletoe

Arceuthobium douglasii is a species of dwarf mistletoe known as Douglas fir dwarf mistletoe. It is native to western North America from British Columbia to Texas to California, where it lives in forest and woodland as a parasite. It is found mostly on Douglas fir (Pseudotsuga menziesii) trees, but occasionally on fir (Abies spp.), as well.

This greenish shrub is visible as a network of scaly stems extending above the bark of its host tree. Most of the mistletoe is located inside the host tree, attached to it via haustoria, which tap the tree for water and nutrients. The leaves of the mistletoe are reduced to scales on its surface. It is dioecious, with male and female mistletoe plants producing spikes of staminate and pistillate flowers, respectively. The fruit is a sticky berry a few millimeters long which explodes to disperse the seeds it contains several meters away from the parent plant and its host tree.

Three hyperparasitic fungi are known to parasitize A. douglasii: Caliciopsis arceuthobii, which infects the female flowers and fruit, Colletotrichum gloeosporioides, which causes black lesions at the stem nodes, and Cylindrocarpon gillii, which causes yellow-white lesions along the stems.

== Taxonomy ==
In 1878 George Engelmann described a new species in the Arceuthobium genus which he named Arceuthobium douglasii. The botanist Otto Kuntze proposed moving it to Razoumofskya in 1891, but this has not become the accepted classification. Along with its genus it is part of the Santalaceae family and it has no other botanical synonyms.
