= Lucy Millington =

American botanist and writer (1825–1900)

Lucy Ann Millington
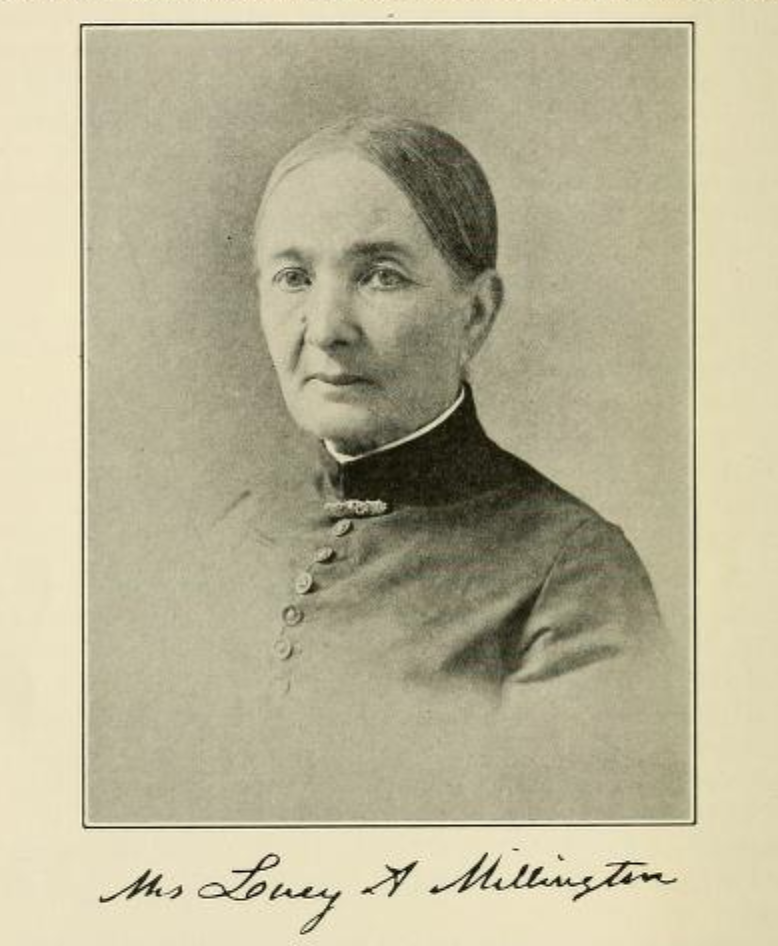
- Born: Lucy A. Bishop; June 10, 1825
- Died: January 17, 1900 (aged 74); New Russia, New York
- Resting place: New Russia, New York
- Citizenship: United States of America
- Spouse: Stokes P. Millington
- Scientific career
- Fields: botany

Lucy Ann Bishop Millington (June 10, 1825 – January 17, 1900) was an American self-taught botanist known for her discovery of Arceuthobium pusillum, a species of dwarf mistletoe that was damaging trees in New York State.

== Early life and education ==
Born Lucy Bishop, she was the second child in a wealthy merchant family that owned several businesses in New Russia (now Elizabethtown), a town in the Adirondack region of New York. Bishop was self-taught, though she likely attended local schools.

== Career and research ==
Millington had a decades-long career in botany; her first notable publication was the 1871 discovery of A. pusillum. She proceeded to publish a number of articles in popular science and contributed extensively to herbaria in New York. Throughout her career, she corresponded and collaborated with Charles Peck. She is commemorated alongside the rest of her family, with statues in their hometown. She was a mentor to Liberty Hyde Bailey, whom she first met in 1876 in Michigan, when she was already established and he an eighteen-year-old student interested in botany.

Millington died in New Russia, New York and her gravestone says: Lucy A. Bishop, wife of Stokes P. Millington, 1825-1900.

== Selected publications ==
The published writings of Lucy Millington pertaining to natural history:

- Millington, Lucy (1868). "An albino humming-bird". Amer. Naturalist. 2 (2): 110.
- Millington, Lucy (November 1871a). "New mistletoe". Bull. Torrey Bot. Club. 2 (11): 43–44.
- Millington, Lucy (December 1871b). "Arceuthobium". Bull. Torrey Bot. Club. 2 (12): 47–48.
- Millington, Lucy (1872a). "Sphagnum". Old and New. 6 (2): 237–243.
- Millington, Lucy (1872b). "Aspidium thelypteris Swartz". Bull. Torrey Bot. Club. 3 (9): 43–44.
- Millington, Lucy (1872c). "Fungi". Bull. Torrey Bot. Club. 3 (9): 44.
- Millington, Lucy (1872d). "Arceuthobium shedding its seed". Bull. Torrey Bot. Club. 3 (12): 55–56.
- Millington, Lucy (1873). "Ferns". Old and New. 8 (6): 694–698.
- Millington, Lucy (1874). "Variations". Bull. Torrey Bot. Club. 5 (2): 9.
- Millington, Lucy (1875a). "Winter in the Adirondacks". Old and New. 11 (2): 201–206.
- Millington, Lucy (1875b). "Thoreau and Wilson Flagg". Old and New. 11 (4): 460–464.
- Millington, Lucy A. (1882). "Summer days at Lake George" (PDF). St. Nicholas. 9 (10): 794–803.
- Millington, Lucy A. (1883). "The bulbs of Epilobium palustre". Bull. Torrey Bot. Club. 10 (2): 24.
- Millington, Lucy A. (1899). "The continuance of species". J. Natl. Sci. Club. 2 (5). Washington, D.C.: 15–18.

== Bibliography ==
- Smith, Beatrice Sheer (1992). "Lucy Bishop Millington, Nineteenth-century Botanist: Her Life and Letters to Charles Horton Peck, State Botanist of New York" (PDF). Huntia: A Journal of Botanical History. 8 (2): 111–153. Archived from the original (PDF) on March 28, 2019.
