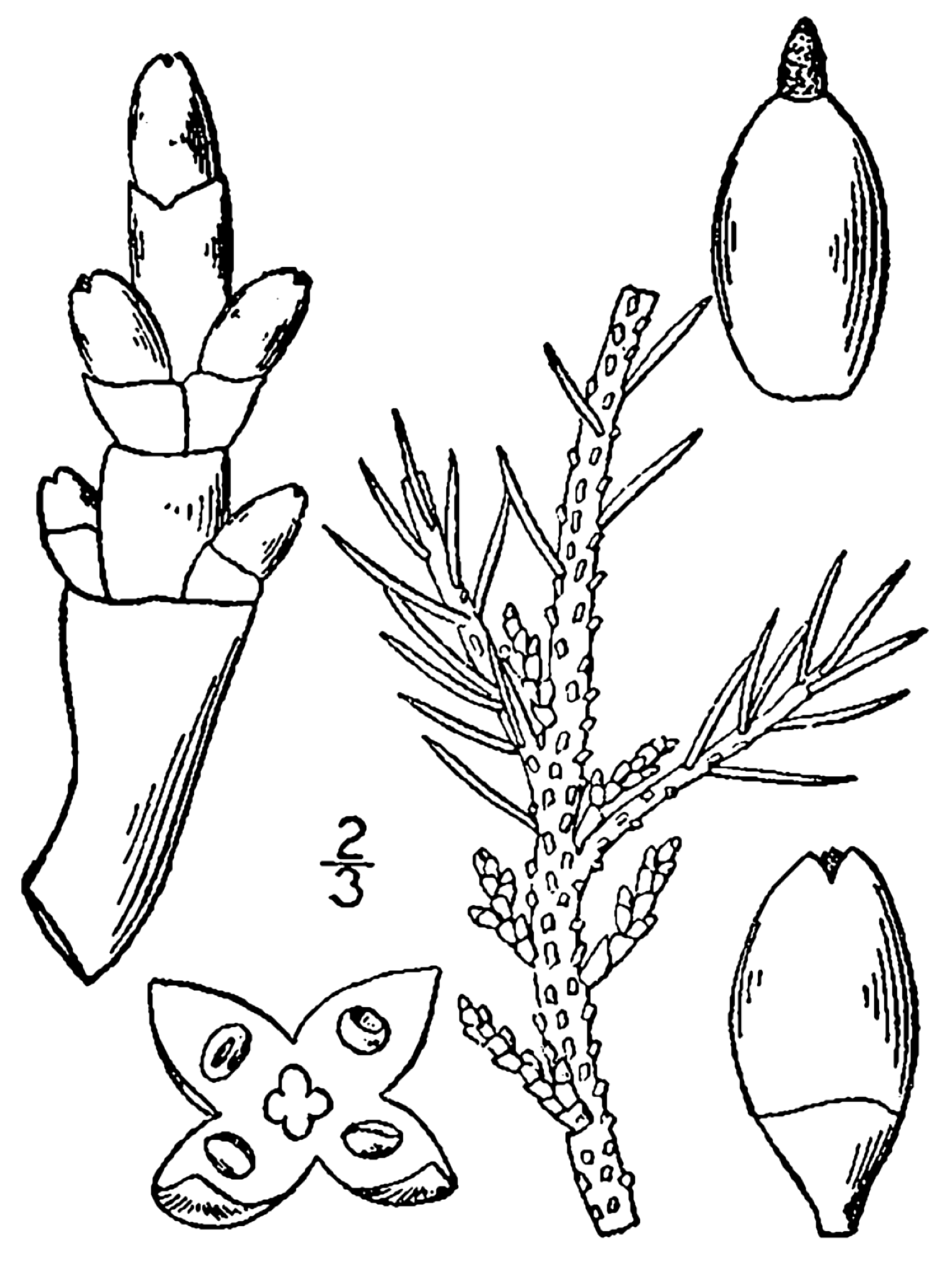
- Botanical illustration of A. pusillum

Conservation status
- Secure (NatureServe)

Scientific classification
- Kingdom: Plantae
- Clade: Embryophytes
- Clade: Tracheophytes
- Clade: Angiosperms
- Clade: Eudicots
- Order: Santalales
- Family: Santalaceae
- Genus: Arceuthobium
- Species: A. pusillum

Binomial name
- Arceuthobium pusillum Peck
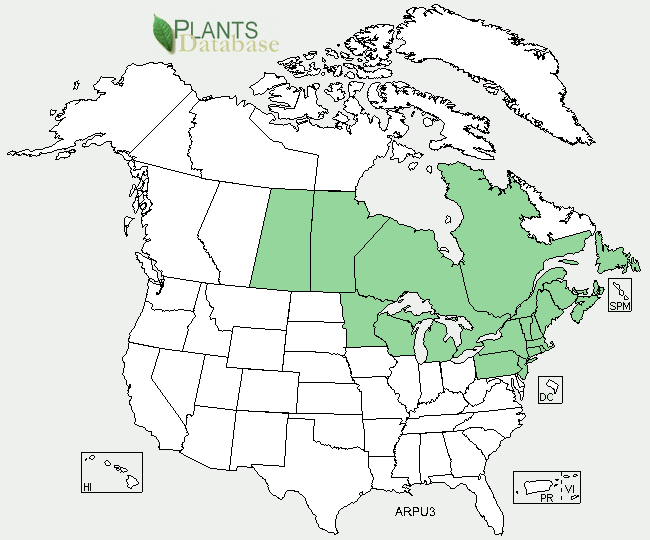
- Range within North America

Synonyms
- Homotypic synonyms: Razoumofskya pusilla (Peck) Kuntze; Heterotypic synonyms: Arceuthobium abigenium (Alph.Wood) Alph.Wood; Arceuthobium minutum Engelm.; Arceuthobium oxycedri var. abigenium Alph.Wood; Razoumofskya minuta (Engelm.) Kuntze

= Arceuthobium pusillum =

Species of dwarf mistletoe

Arceuthobium pusillum, the eastern dwarf mistletoe, is a species of parasitic plant in the sandalwood family Santalaceae. It is the only dwarf mistletoe that occurs in eastern North America and the smallest dwarf mistletoe in the New World. Its principal host is the black spruce (Picea mariana). It was first made known to science by Lucy Millington in 1871.

== Description ==
Eastern dwarf mistletoe is a hemiparasitic plant which grows inside the stems of a host plant. Once a seed lands on a branch it will germinate and grow a haustorium which penetrates past the cambium layer and into the host's xylem and phloem tissues; from those tissues it gathers nutrients needed for its own growth and reproduction. Until the mistletoe grows aerial stems it will be completely reliant on the host for all nutrients and energy; even after it grows aerial stems it will still not produce enough energy to support itself and will still be still reliant on the host.

After 2–12 years from the start of the infection, the mistletoe will grow an aerial stem from the tree branch it inhabits. The aerial stem is 1 cm (0.4 in) long on average, occasionally reaching lengths of 3 cm. It may be green, orange, red, maroon, or brown. Dwarf mistletoe is dioecious, with distinct male and female plants: the male (staminate) flowers are 2mm across and mostly trimerous (having 3 petals or sepals) but may be 2–4-merous. The mature fruits are green, 1.5-3mm sized berries. When the seeds ripen in the autumn, the fruits forcefully eject the seeds using a ballistic dispersal mechanism known as ballochory. The dispersed seeds are coated in a sticky substance that allows them to adhere to whatever they touch. After rain, the sticky seed will slide down a needle that it has landed upon onto a stem where it will then germinate and enter into the host. The seeds may spread long distances via animals.

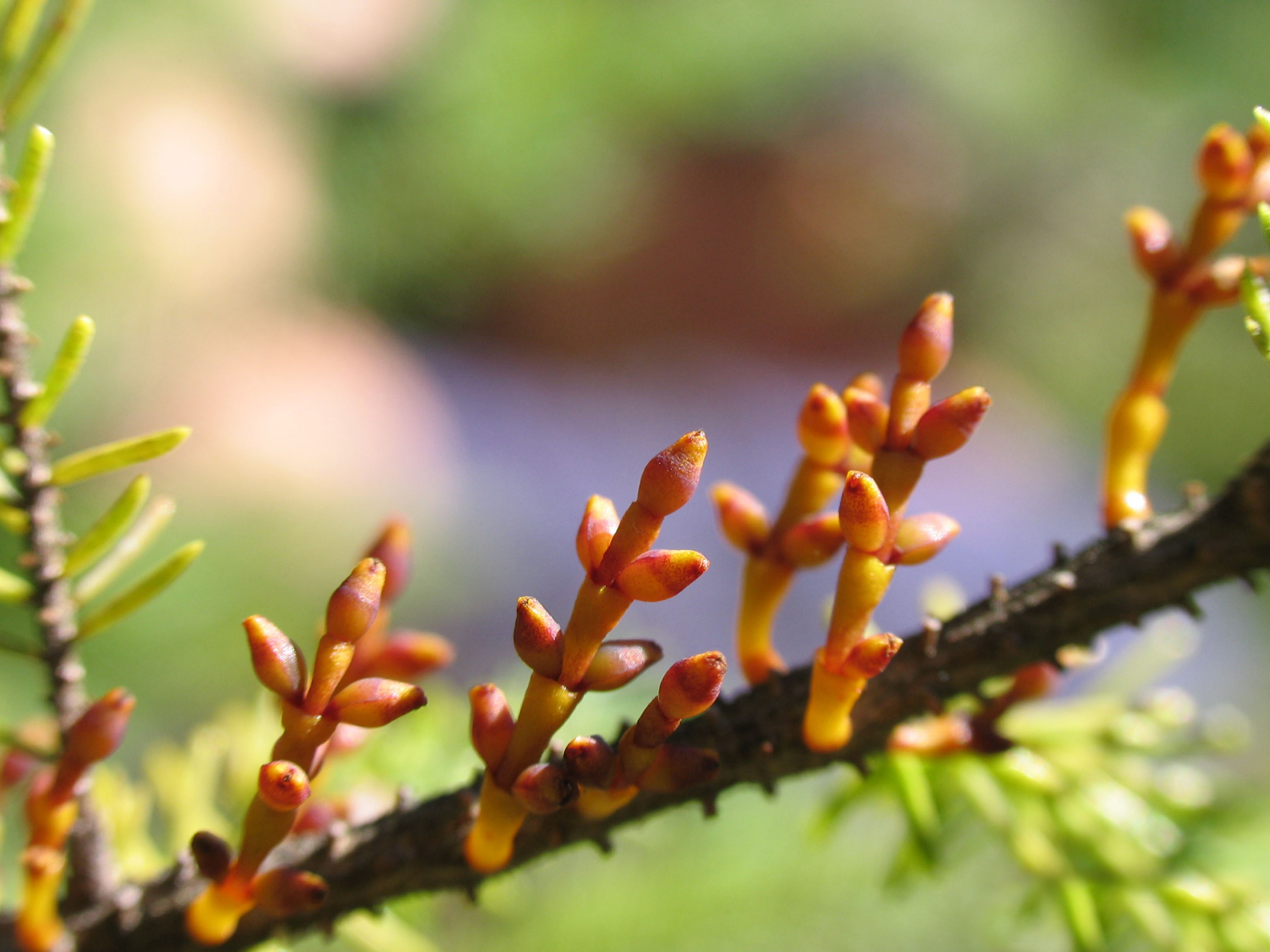
Arceuthobium pusillum

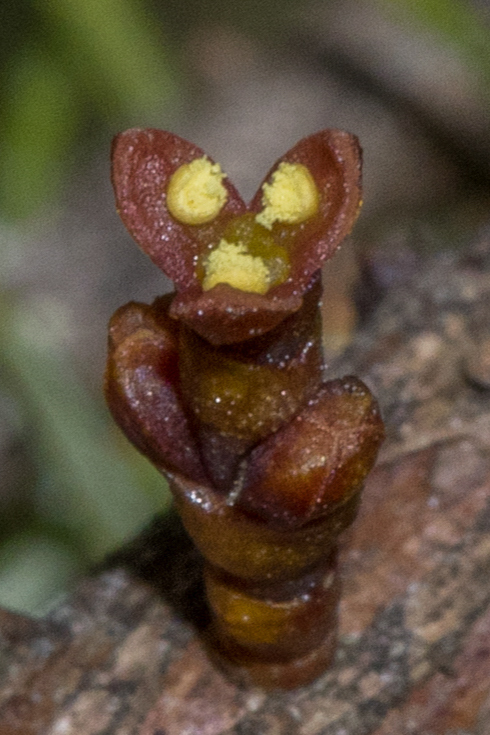
Flower with three petals and three anthers in April (Vermont)

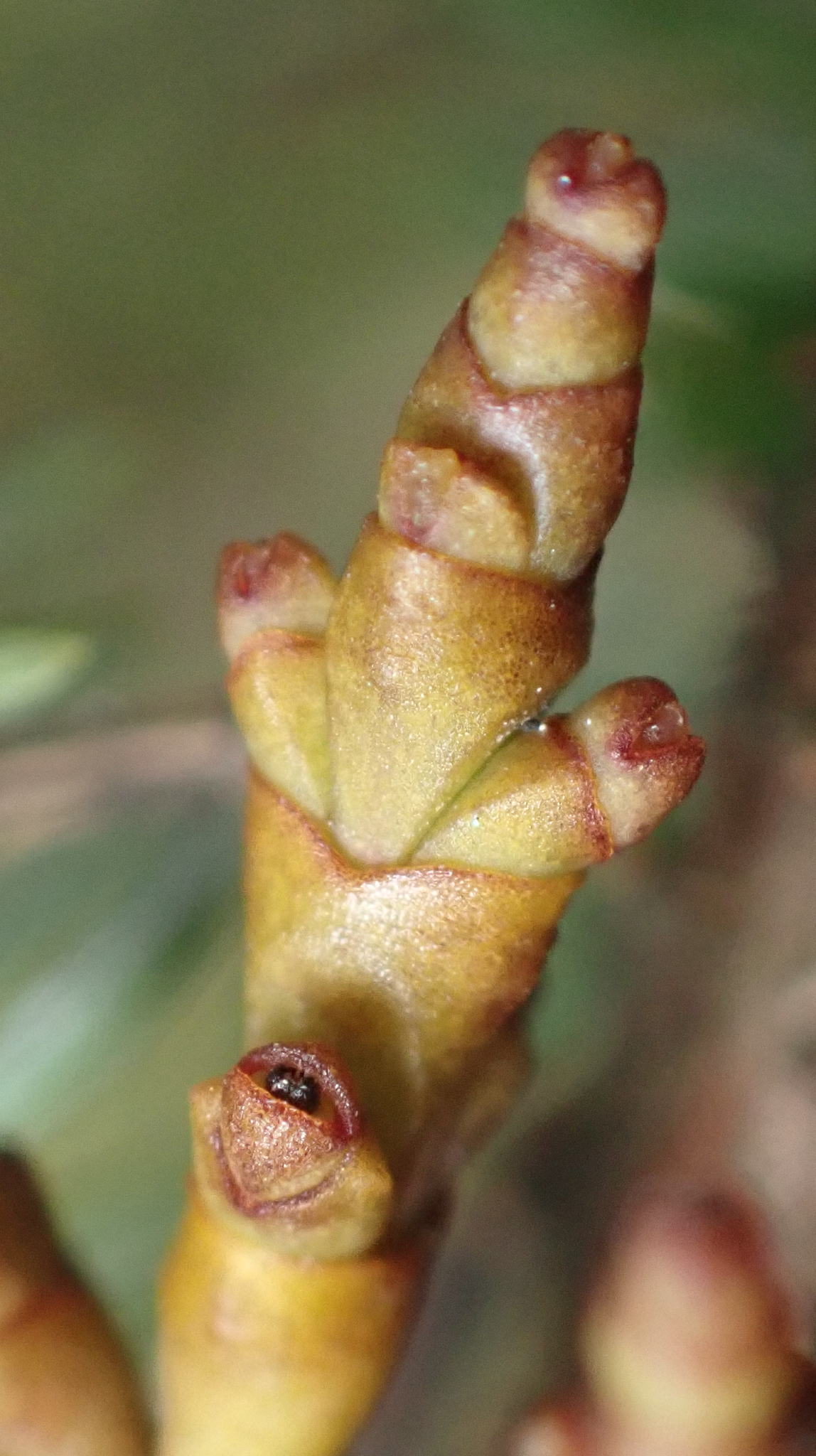
Flowers with stigmas in April (New York)

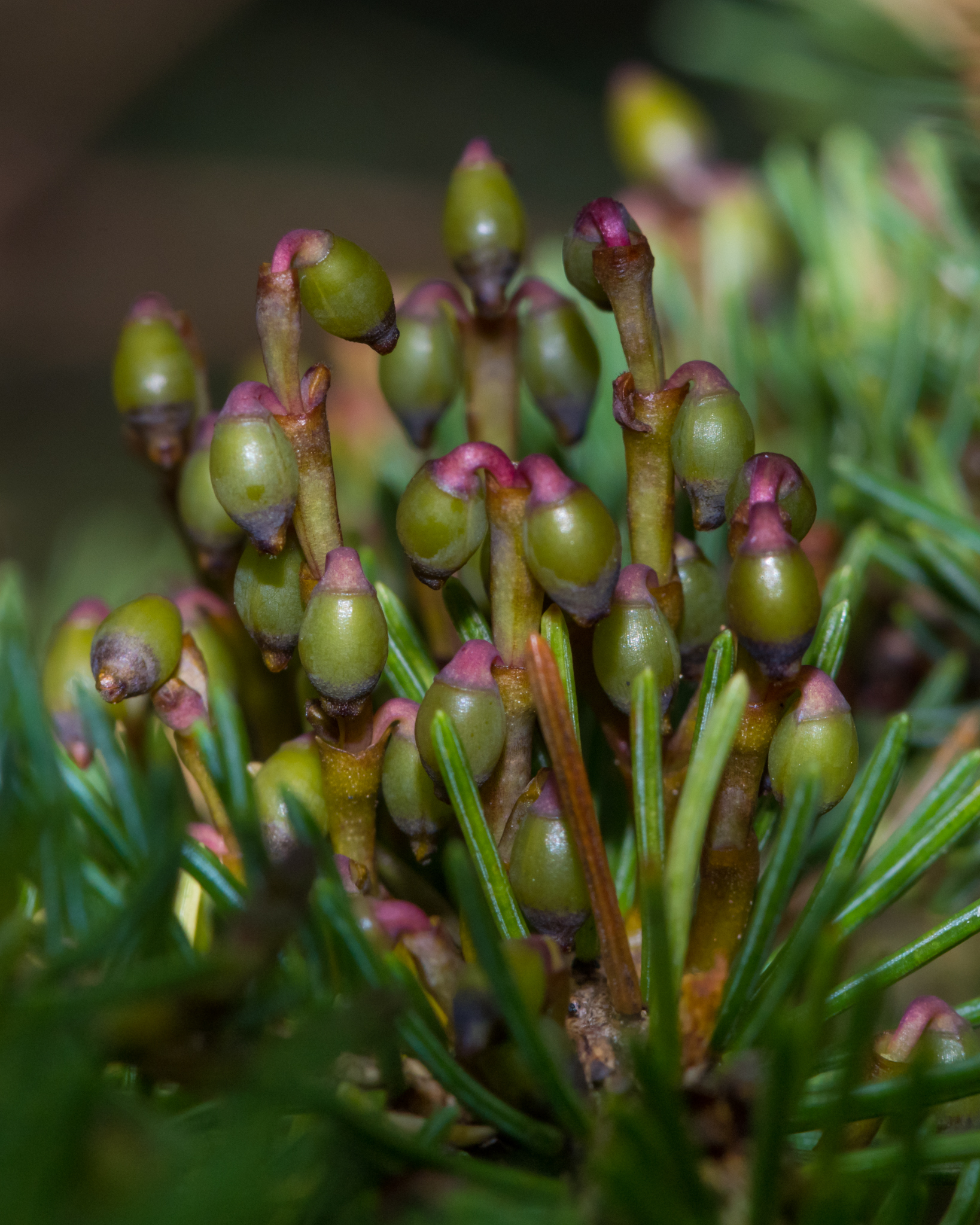
Ripe fruits in September (Nova Scotia)

== Taxonomy ==
Arceuthobium pusillum was named and described by the American mycologist Charles Horton Peck in 1872. Peck's first description was based on a specimen collected in Sand Lake, New York on September 14, 1871. A more thorough description was included in his Report of the Botanist (1871) published in 1873. A third description, based on a new specimen collected in Forestburgh, New York, was published in 1875. At Forestburgh, Peck discovered Caliciopsis arceuthobii, a fungal pathogen on Arceuthobium pusillum. The specific epithet pusillum, which means "very small", indicates the overall size of the plant.

The taxon known as Arceuthobium pusillum was first described by the American botanist Lucy Millington in 1871. Millington's first specimen was collected in Warrensburg, New York on August 10, 1871, a few weeks prior to Peck's collection. She subsequently sent specimens accompanied by a letter to the editors of the Bulletin of the Torrey Botanical Club in New York. The editors suspected the specimens to be those of a gall but Millington believed it was a mistletoe. A year later in 1872, Millington provided the first description of ballistic seed dispersal in Arceuthobium pusillum.

Millington's published description did not include a name. When Peck's first description of Arceuthobium pusillum was read before the Albany Institute on February 6, 1872, he was aware that his "plant was detected in the Adirondack mountains a few weeks previous to its discovery in Sandlake" but he gave no further details. In his second description published in 1873, Peck noted that Arceuthobium pusillum "was detected near Warrensburgh, Warren county, by Mrs. L. Millington, a few weeks previous to its discovery in Sandlake", but at the time he still had not seen a specimen. Apparently the editors of the Bulletin sent Millington's specimens to Torrey and Gray but they did not send a specimen to Peck.

== Distribution and habitat ==
Arceuthobium pusillum is the only dwarf mistletoe that occurs in eastern North America. From west to east, its range extends from eastern Saskatchewan to Newfoundland in Canada, and from northern Minnesota to the coast of Maine in the United States:

- Canada: Saskatchewan, Manitoba, Ontario, Quebec, New Brunswick, Nova Scotia, Prince Edward Island, Newfoundland
- United States: Minnesota, Wisconsin, Michigan, New York, Pennsylvania, New Jersey, Connecticut, Massachusetts, Vermont, New Hampshire, Rhode Island, Maine

It is found in spruce forests within 500 m (1,600 ft) of coastal and inland bogs, often within 2 km (1.2 mi) of lakes and rivers.

== Ecology ==
=== Host species ===
Arceuthobium pusillum is an obligate hemiparasitic plant. It infects several conifer species, most commonly black spruce (Picea mariana). It is less common on both white spruce (Picea glauca) and red spruce (Picea rubens). Occasionally it will infect tamarack (Larix laricina). Other conifers are only rarely infected, including balsam fir (Abies balsamea), Jack pine (Pinus banksiana), red pine (Pinus resinosa), and eastern white pine (Pinus strobus). The western species blue spruce (Picea pungens) became infected when planted in Maine and Ontario.

=== Associations with other species ===
The hyperparasitic fungus Caliciopsis arceuthobii is an uncommon pathogen on A. pusillum, appearing as black masses on the female flowers and fruit. Infection by C. arceuthobii causes decreased seed yield and sometimes death.

== As a pathogen ==
Arceuthobium spp. are considered to be a very serious pest in northern American forests. Unlike the other mistletoes in the Loranthaceae and Viscaceae families, the dwarf mistletoes have very reduced photosynthetic capability and draw heavily on the host for carbohydrates and diminish the amounts of carbohydrates and energy available to the host. The dwarf mistletoe also has a girdling effect on the stem which is infected, meaning that there is an accumulation of sugars distal to the infection which limits the flow of sugars and other chemicals, including hormones, needed by the roots, resulting in dieback of the tree. Due to cytokinins not being transported properly, witches broom may result on the infected trees. The combined effects of dwarf mistletoe distort and suppress the growth of branches and affect the main trunk by causing swellings, knots, or structural weakening.

If a young tree or seedling is infected by the mistletoe, the probability that the tree will die is great. In one study it was determined that 50% of infected seedlings will die over 12 years and the survivors will often be bush-like and not develop properly. In Manitoba Canada, infection by A. pusillum on White spruce reduced the annual radial growth from 6.7mm to 1.4-.4mm.

A. pusillum is considered the most damaging disease in black spruce in the Great Lakes region. Dwarf mistletoe also causes major trunk swellings on red spruce, significantly reducing the value of the lumber; these swellings are not common on black spruce, perhaps due to the fact that black spruce is a much shorter-lived species.

While A. pusillum does not spread rapidly and therefore cannot be considered a highly invasive species, it can build up gradually within a stand of trees and cause severe damage.

== Endangered status ==
A. pusillum is listed as endangered in Connecticut, New Jersey, and Rhode Island as well as threatened in Pennsylvania.

== Bibliography ==
- Gledhill, David (2008). The Names of Plants (4th ed.). Cambridge University Press. ISBN 978-0-521-86645-3.
- Hawksworth, Frank G.; Wiens, Delbert (March 1996). Dwarf Mistletoes: Biology, Pathology, and Systematics (PDF) (Report). Washington, DC: United States Department of Agriculture, Forest Service.
- Millington, Lucy (November 1871a). "New mistletoe". Bull. Torrey Bot. Club. 2 (11): 43–44.
- Millington, Lucy (December 1871b). "Arceuthobium". Bull. Torrey Bot. Club. 2 (12): 47–48.
- Millington, Lucy (December 1872). "Arceuthobium shedding its seed". Bull. Torrey Bot. Club. 3 (12): 55–56.
- Peck, Charles H. (1872). "Report of the Second Class, in the Second Department (Botany)". Transactions of the Albany Institute. 7: 186–204.
- Peck, Charles H. (1873). "Report of the Botanist (1871)". Twenty-Fifth Annual Report on the New York State Museum of Natural History (Report). Albany: The Argus Company. pp. 57–123.
- Peck, Charles H. (1875). "Report of the Botanist (1873)". Twenty-Seventh Annual Report on the New York State Museum of Natural History (Report). Albany: Weed, Parsons and Company. pp. 73–116.
- Smith, Beatrice Sheer (1992). "Lucy Bishop Millington, Nineteenth-century Botanist: Her Life and Letters to Charles Horton Peck, State Botanist of New York" (PDF). Huntia: A Journal of Botanical History. 8 (2): 111–153. Archived (PDF) from the original on 2025-09-25.
