= Eremascaceae =

Scientific classification
- Kingdom: Fungi
- Division: Ascomycota
- Class: Eurotiomycetes
- Order: Coryneliales
- Family: Eremascaceae; Engl. & E.Gilg (1924)

Genera
- Dactylodendron Stchigel, Rodr.-Andr. & Cano; Eremascus Eidam

Family of fungi

Eremascaceae is a family of fungi in the order Coryneliales. The family was circumscribed by Adolf Engler and E. Gilg in 1924.

Genera:

- Dactylodendron Stchigel, Rodr.-Andr. & Cano
- Eremascus Eidam
