= Eremascus =

Scientific classification
- Kingdom: Fungi
- Division: Ascomycota
- Class: Eurotiomycetes
- Order: Coryneliales
- Family: Eremascaceae
- Genus: Eremascus; Eidam (1883)

Type species
- Eremascus albus Eidam (1883)

Species
- Eremascus albus Eremascus fertilis Eremascus terrestris

Genus of fungi

Eremascus is a genus in the fungal family Eremascaceae. The genus was circumscribed by Eduard Eidam in 1883. Eremascus is thought to be a basal fungus, from which ascomycetous yeasts formed. Taxa have a widespread distribution, and grow saprobically, especially on substrates with low water content.

== Morphology ==
Species of Eremascus produce no arthrospores or conidia. There are generally eight spores produced in each ascus.
