= Everett Stanley Luttrell =

American mycologist

- Born: January 10, 1916; Richmond
- Died: July 5, 1988 (aged 72)
- Occupation: Mycologist
- Employer: University of Georgia

Everett Stanley Luttrell (born in Richmond, Virginia on January 10, 1916; died July 5, 1988) was an American mycologist and plant pathologist at the University of Georgia's Georgia Experiment Station and main campus. He served as the DW Brooks Distinguished Professor of Plant Pathology at the University of Georgia from in 1978 to 1986. Luttrell was particularly known for his work on the classification of perithecial ascomycetes and Helminthosporium.

Luttrell was a member of the American Phytopathological Society (APS), the Botanical Society of America, the British Mycological Society, and the Mycological Society of America (MSA), which he served as president (1972-73). He was honored by the MSA as its MSA Annual Lecturer in 1981, and received its Distinguished Mycologist Award in 1983. He became an APS Fellow in 1972.

The genus Luttrellia was named for him, as was a species of winter barley named for him.

The ES Luttrell Lecture Series at the Department of Plant Pathology at the University of Georgia was established in his honor.

The standard author abbreviation Luttr. is used to indicate this person as the author when citing a botanical name.
