= Harry Morton Fitzpatrick =

American mycologist

- Born: June 27, 1886; Greenwood, Indiana
- Died: December 8, 1949 (aged 63); Ithaca, New York
- Citizenship: United States of America
- Education: Cornell University
- Known for: Taxonomy of the Phycomycetes
- Scientific career
- Fields: Mycology
- Doctoral advisor: George Francis Atkinson
- Author abbrev. (botany): Fitzp.

Harry Morton Fitzpatrick (27 June 1886 – 8 December 1949), was an American mycologist. He was professor of mycology at Cornell. He is known for his work on the Phycomycetes. His book on the Lower Fungi was the standard text and reference work on the Phycomycetes. He trained Clark Thomas Rogerson and Richard P. Korf, two prominent mycologists.

== Biography ==
Harry Morton Fitzpatrick was born on June 27, 1886, in Greenwood, Indiana. He attended high school in Crawfordsville, Indiana, where he became acquainted with mycologist Herbert Hice Whetzel, then a student at Wabash College, who stimulated his interest in mycology. In 1905, he entered Wabash College, where Professor Mason B. Thomas, a great teacher of botany, would further influence Fitzpatrick to study mycology. Encouraged by Whetzel, then Professor at Cornell University, and aided by Professor Thomas, he transferred to Cornell in 1908 as an assistant to Professor George Francis Atkinson in the Department of Botany and received the A.B. degree from the Arts College in 1909. He then entered the Graduate School at Cornell as an Assistant and later as an Instructor in Plant Pathology. He studied mycology under Professor Atkinson. He was awarded the Ph.D. degree in 1913. He was immediately appointed Assistant Professor by Whetzel in the recently organized Department of Plant Pathology at Cornell, and began the work of teaching mycology to which he devoted the remainder of his life. He was raised to a full Professorship in 1922.

Harry Morton Fitzpatrick died in Ithaca, New York on December 8, 1949.

== Mycological contributions ==
Harry Morton Fitzpatrick's contributions to mycology include monographs of the Coryneliaceae and Nitschkiaceae. Fitzpatrick is best known for his influential text The Lower Fungi. Phycomycetes, which was published in 1930, and is credited for the posthumous publication of Whetzel's 1945 monograph of the Sclerotineaceae. Fitzpatrick took an active role in the founding of the Mycological Society of America (MSA) at New Orleans, Louisiana on December 29, 1931. Fitzpatrick served as the first Secretary-Treasurer of the MSA (1932–1935), as the fifth President of the MSA (1936), and as Historian of the MSA until his death. He published biographies of mycologists George Francis Atkinson, Curtis Gates Lloyd, Fred Carleton Stewart, and Herbert Hice Whetzel. He trained Clark Thomas Rogerson and Richard P. Korf, two students that would become prominent mycologists.

=== Taxa described ===
- Acanthonitschkea macrobarbata Fitzp. 1923
- Blastocladiales Fitzp. 1930
- Caliciopsis pseudotsugae Fitzp. 1942
- Caliciopsis symploci Fitzp. 1942
- Calyculosphaeria Fitzp. 1923
- Calyculosphaeria macrospora Fitzp. 1923
- Claudopus subdepluens Fitzp. 1915
- Corynelia bispora Fitzp. 1920
- Corynelia brasiliensis Fitzp. 1920
- Corynelia jamaicensis Fitzp. 1920
- Corynelia nipponensis Fitzp. 1920
- Coryneliospora Fitzp. 1942
- Hysterangium stoloniferum var. americanum Fitzp. 1913
- Lagenulopsis Fitzp. 1942
- Nitschkia floridana Fitzp. 1923
- Nitschkieae Fitzp. 1923
- Rostronitschkia Fitzp. 1919
- Rostronitschkia nervincola Fitzp. 1919
- Thamnidiaceae Fitzp. 1930
- Tripospora macrospora Fitzp. 1942
- Tympanopsis uniseriata Fitzp. 1923

== Honors and memberships ==
In 1936, H.M. Fitzpatrick was elected as the fifth President of the Mycological Society of America.

In 1996, The Mycological Society of America established a Mentor Student Travel Award in honor of Harry Morton Fitzpatrick.

Fitzpatrick was a member of the American Association for the Advancement of Science, the Botanical Society of America, the American Phytopathological Society, the Mycological Society of America, the British Mycological Society, Sigma Xi and Phi Kappa Phi.

=== Eponymous taxa ===
- Fitzpatrickia Cif. 1928
- Fitzpatrickella Benny, Samuelson & Kimbr. 1985

== Selected publications ==
- 1919. Fitzpatrick, H.M. Rostronitschkia, a new genus of pyrenomycetes. Mycologia 11: 163-167, 1 plate.
- 1920. Fitzpatrick, H.M. Monograph of the Coryneliaceae. Mycologia 12: 206-237, 239-267, 7 plates.
- 1923. Fitzpatrick, H.M. Monograph of the Nitschkieae. Mycologia 15: 23-44, 7 plates.
- 1923. Fitzpatrick, H.M. Monograph of the Nitschkieae. Mycologia 15: 23-67, 7 plates.
- 1923. Fitzpatrick, H.M. Monograph of the Nitschkieae. Mycologia 15 (2): 45-67.
- 1923. Fitzpatrick, H.M. Generic concepts in the Pythiaceae and Blastocladiaceae. Mycologia 15: 166-173.
- 1927. Fitzpatrick, H.M. A mycological survey of Puerto Rico and the Virgin Island (Review). Mycologia 19: 144-149.
- 1930. Fitzpatrick, H.M. The Lower Fungi. Phycomycetes. 331 pp. UK, London; McGraw Hill Publishing Co. Ltd.
- 1942. Fitzpatrick, H.M. Revisionary studies in the Coryneliaceae. Mycologia 34 (4): 464-488.
- 1942. Fitzpatrick, H.M. Revisionary studies in the Coryneliaceae. II. The genus Caliciopsis. Mycologia 34 (5): 489-514.
- 1943. Fitzpatrick, H.M. Note. Persoon, C.H. Icones pictae specierum rariorum fungorum. Mycologia 35: 256-257.
- 1951. Fitzpatrick, H.M. Notes on Corynelia oreophila (Speg.) Starb. and closely related species. Mycologia 43: 437-444, 11 figs.
