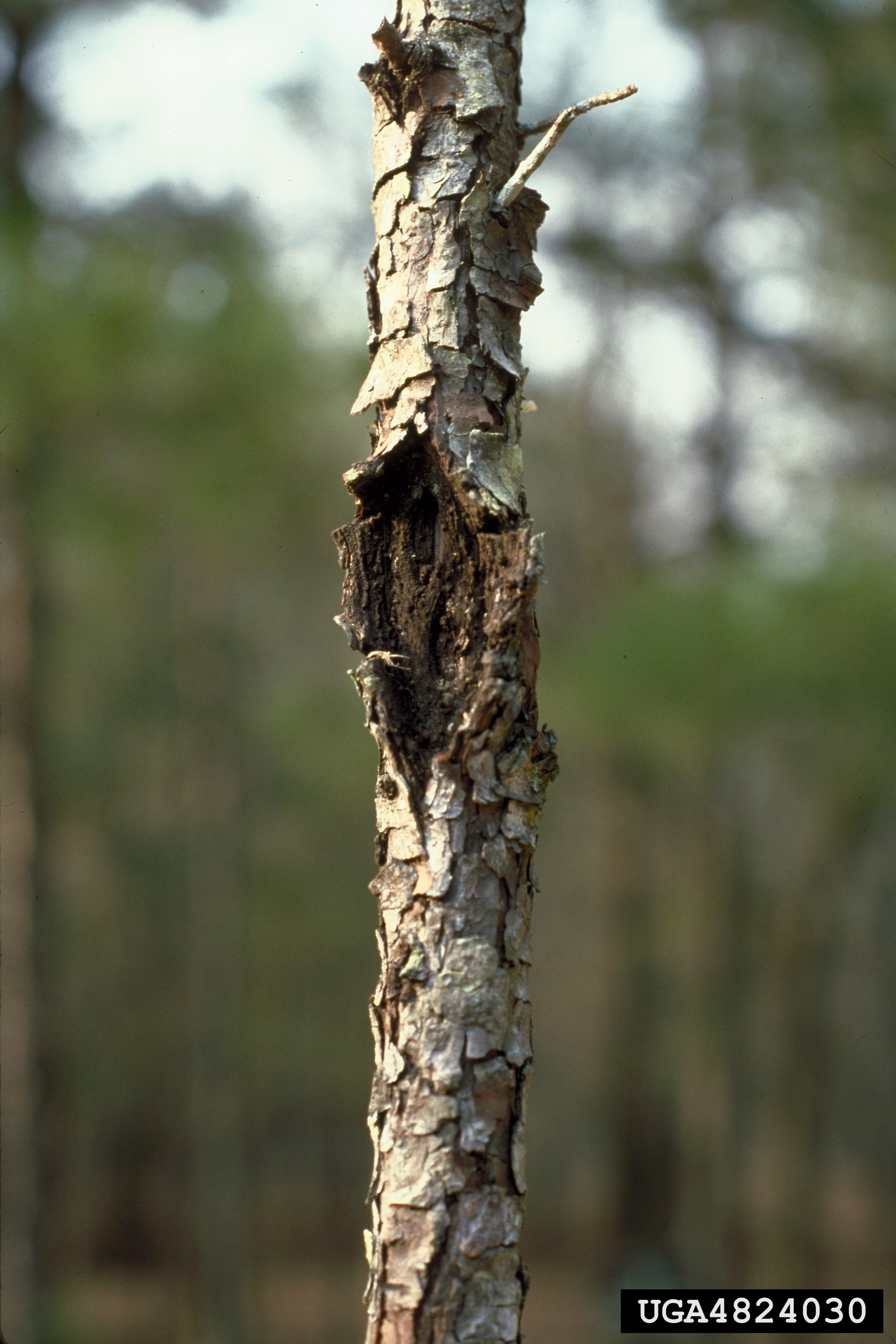
- Caliciopsis pinea on Pinus taeda

Scientific classification
- Kingdom: Fungi
- Division: Ascomycota
- Class: Eurotiomycetes
- Subclass: Coryneliomycetidae; A.R. Wood, Damm, J.Z. Groenew., Cheew. & Crous, 2016
- Order: Coryneliales; Seaver & Chardón, 1926

Families
- Coryneliaceae; Eremascaceae

= Coryneliales =

Order of fungi

The Coryneliales are an order of ascomycetous fungi within the monotypic subclass Coryneliomycetidae in the class Eurotiomycetes and within the subdivision Pezizomycotina. Species in this order are found almost exclusively in the tropics, primarily as a pathogen on the gymnosperm Podocarpus, although it has been found on other plants like the Southern Hemisphere beech Nothofagus, and Drimys.

== Taxonomy ==
The order was circumscribed by Fred Jay Seaver and Carlos E. Chardón in 1924. The taxonomy as of 2022 recognizes 2 families, 10 genera and 83 species:

- Family Coryneliaceae Sacc. ex Berl. & Voglino, 1886
  - Caliciopsis Peck, 1880 – 36 species
  - Corynelia Ach., 1823 – 16 species
  - Coryneliopsis Butin, 1971 – 2 species
  - Coryneliospora Fitzp., 1942 – 2 species
  - Fitzpatrickella Benny, Samuelson & Kimbr., 1985 – 1 species
  - Lagenulopsis Fitzp., 1942 – 1 species
  - Pewenomyces F. Balocchi, I. Barnes & M.J. Wingfield, 2021 – 1 species
  - Tripospora Sacc. ex Berl. & Vogl., 1886 – 5 species
- Family Eremascaceae Engl. & E. Gilg, 1924
  - Dactylodendron Stchigel, Rodr.-Andr. & Cano, 2019 – 3 species
  - Eremascus Eidam, 1883 – 2 species
