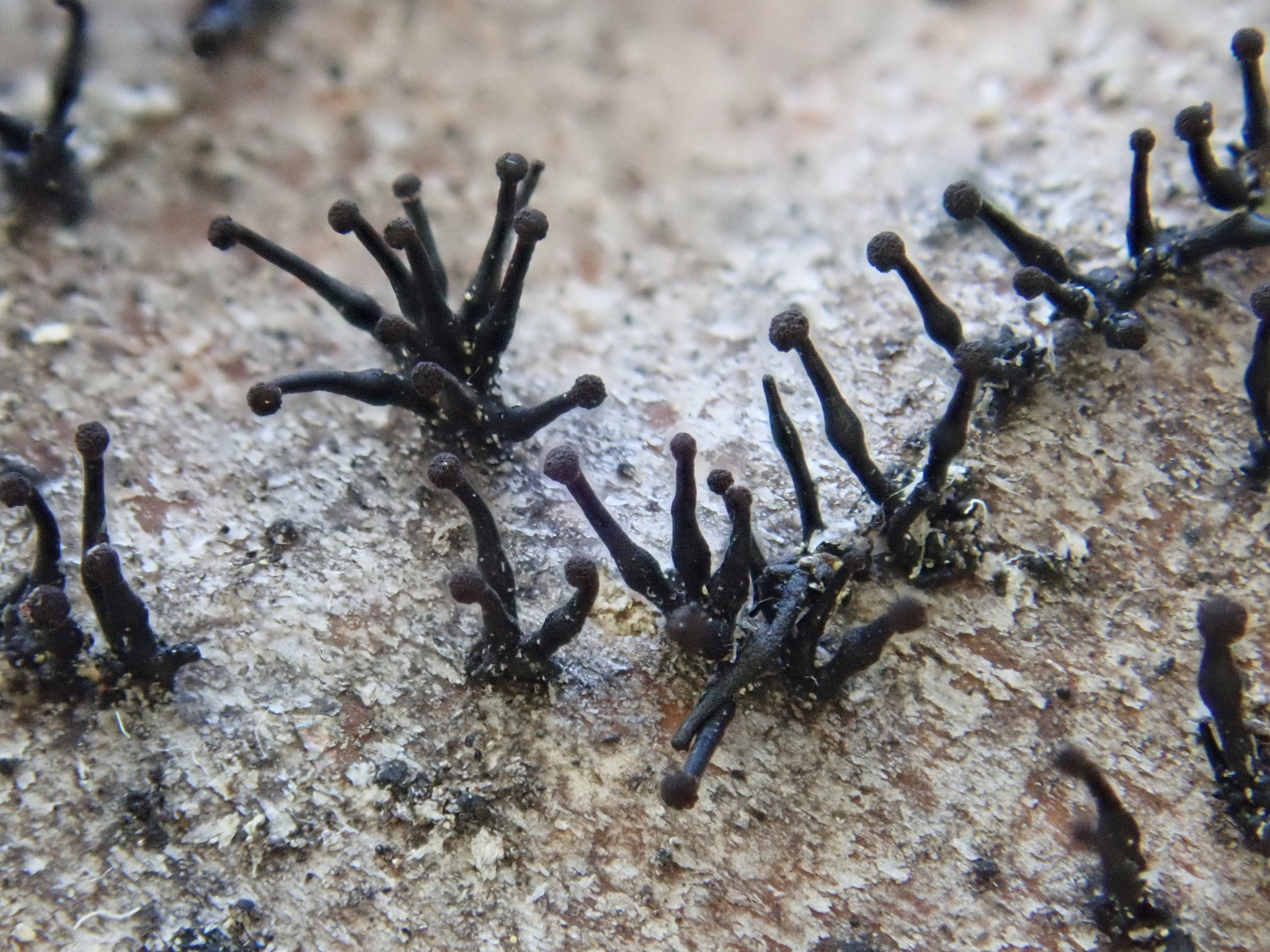
- Caliciopsis calicioides

Scientific classification
- Kingdom: Fungi
- Division: Ascomycota
- Class: Eurotiomycetes
- Subclass: Coryneliomycetidae
- Order: Coryneliales
- Family: Coryneliaceae

Genera
- Caliciopsis; Corynelia; Hypsotheca; Fitzpatrickella; Lagenulopsis; Pewenomyces; Tripospora

= Coryneliaceae =

Family of fungi

Coryneliaceae is a family of fungi in the order Coryneliales. The family is mostly made up of pathogenic fungi with a global distribution. This family was traditionally classified by morphological means, but recent DNA sequencing has resulted in revisions to the family.
