= Outline of Indonesia =

Country in Southeast Asia

The Flag of Indonesia

The National emblem of Indonesia

The location of Indonesia

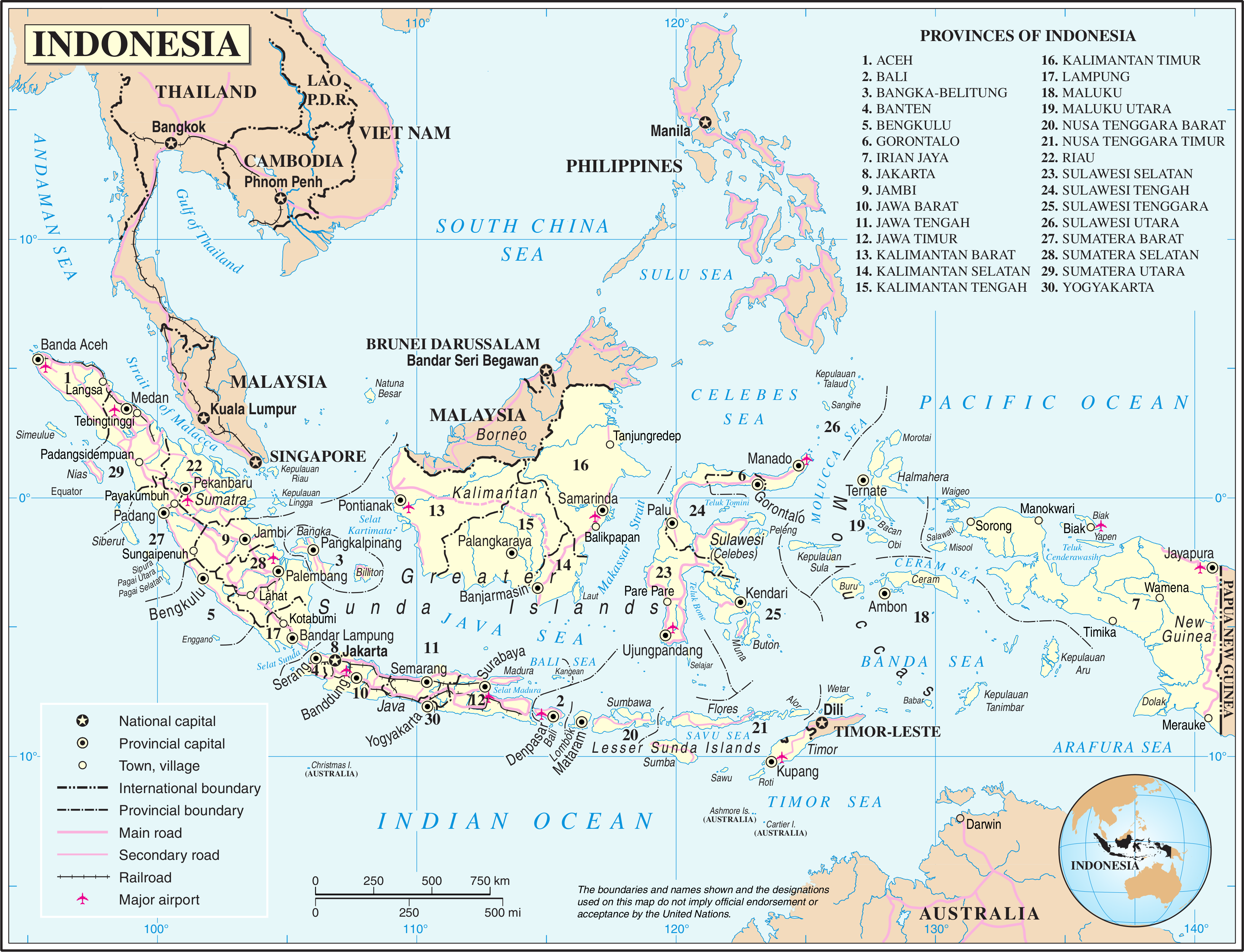
An enlargeable map of the Republic of Indonesia (excluding North Kalimantan, Riau Islands, West Papua, and West Sulawesi)

The following outline is provided as an overview of and topical guide to Indonesia:

Indonesia – sovereign island nation located in Southeast Asia comprising more than 17,000 islands of the Maritime Southeast Asia.

== General reference ==
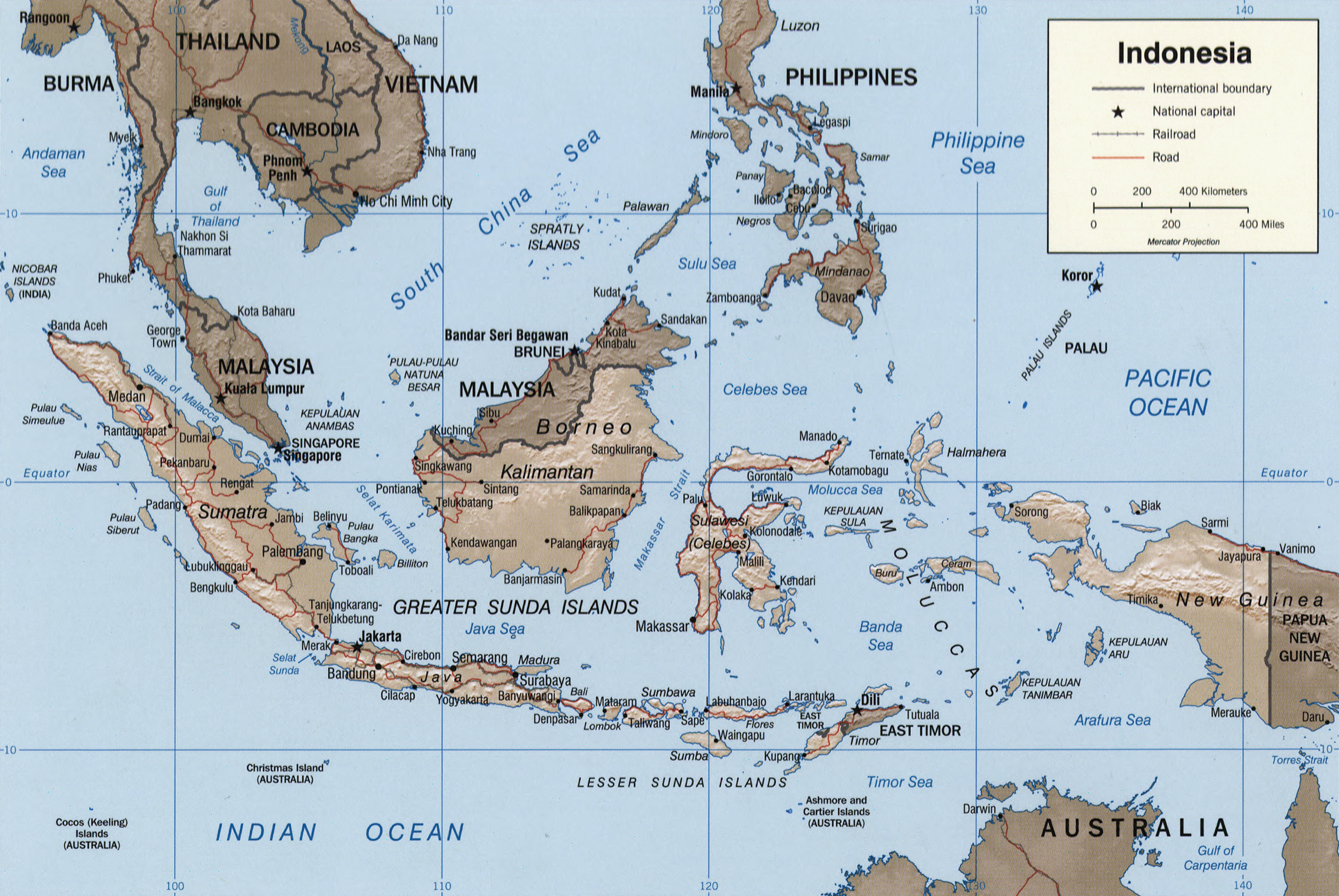
An enlargeable relief map of Indonesia

- Pronunciation: /ˌɪndəˈniːʒə, -ziə, -ʃə/
- Common English country name: Indonesia
- Official English country name: The Republic of Indonesia
- Common endonym(s): Indonesia
- Official endonym(s): Republik Indonesia
- Adjectival(s): Indonesian
- Etymology: Names of Indonesia
- International rankings of Indonesia
  - Largest archipelagic state
  - Fourth most populous country
  - Fifteenth largest country
- ISO country codes: ID, IDN, 360
- ISO region codes: See ISO 3166-2:ID
- Internet country code top-level domain: .id
- ISD: +62

== Geography of Indonesia ==
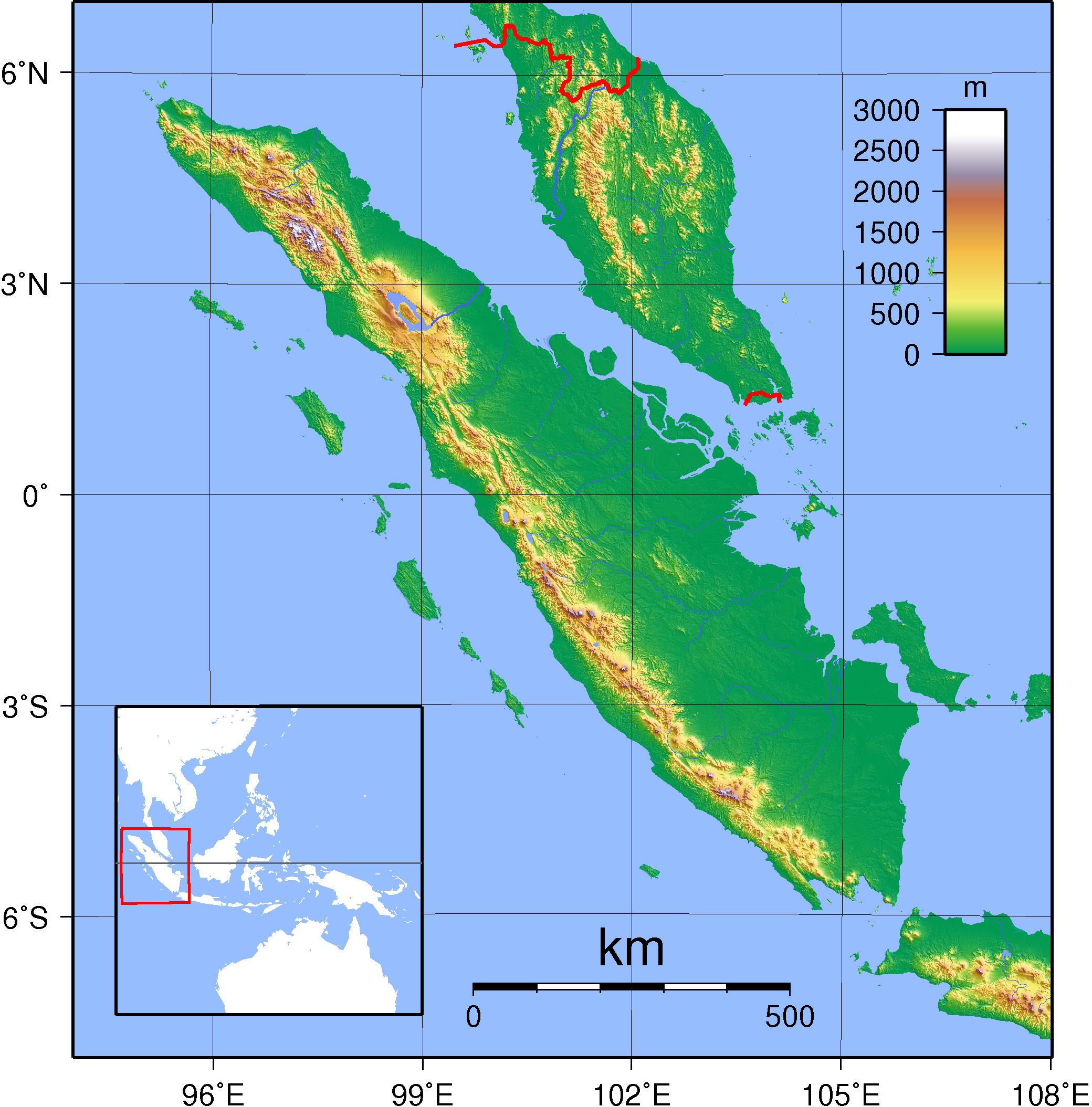
An enlargeable topographic map of the island of Sumatra

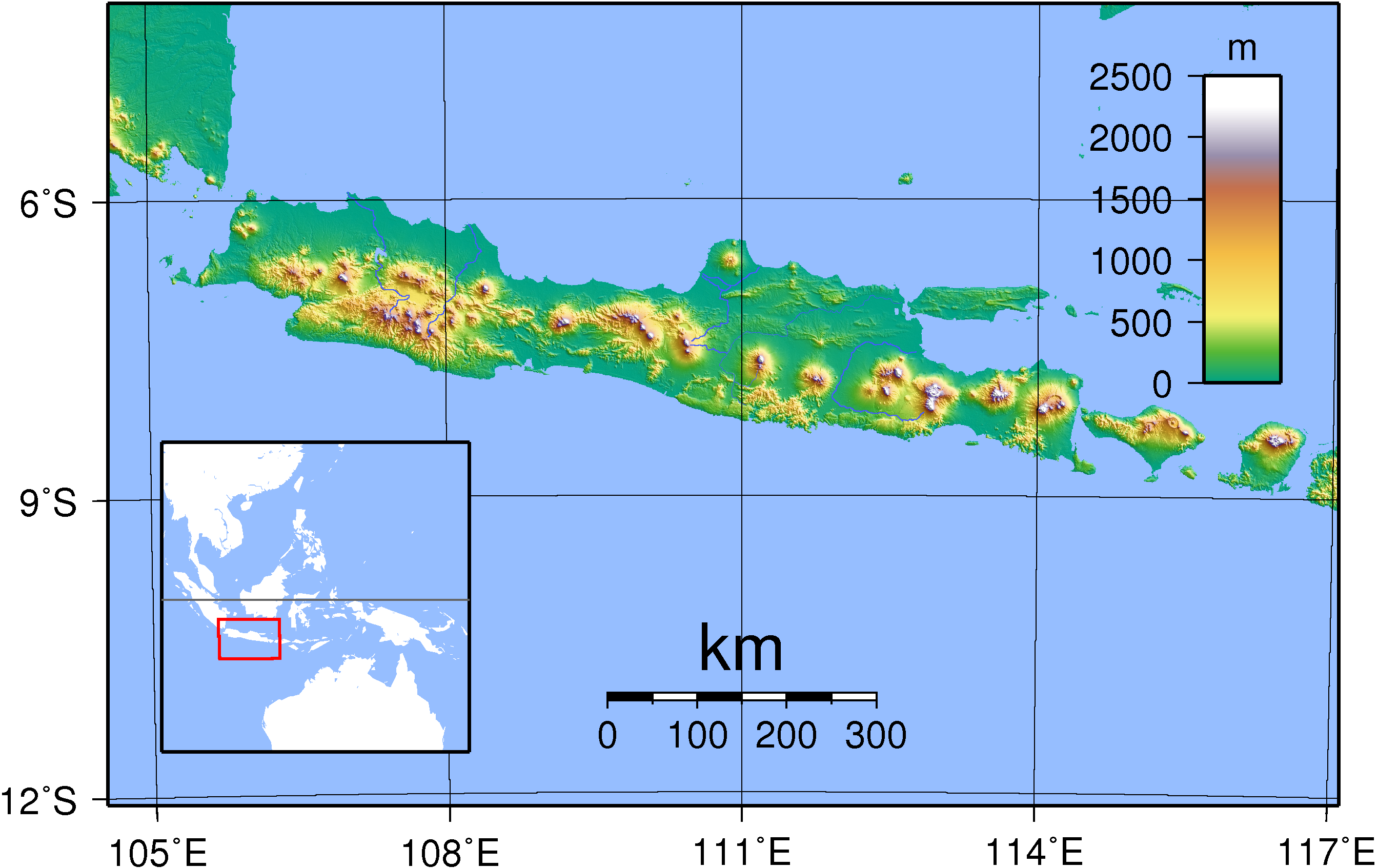
An enlargeable topographic map of the island of Java, the most populous island on Earth

- Indonesia is: an equatorial megadiverse island country
- Location:
  - Eastern Hemisphere, on the Equator
  - Eurasia (though not on the mainland)
    - Asia
      - Southeast Asia
        - Maritime Southeast Asia
  - Oceania (part of New Guinea)
  - Between:
    - Indian Ocean
    - Pacific Ocean
  - Time zones:
    - East Indonesian Time (UTC+09)
    - Central Indonesian Time (UTC+08)
    - West Indonesian Time (UTC+07)
  - Extreme points of Indonesia
    - High: Puncak Jaya on New Guinea 4,884 m (16,024 ft) – highest point on any ocean island
    - Low: Indian Ocean 0 m
  - Land boundaries

Malaysia
Papua New Guinea
Timor-Leste

- Territorial waters of Indonesia
- Population of Indonesia
- Area of Indonesia
- Armorial of Indonesia
- Atlas of Indonesia

=== Environment of Indonesia ===
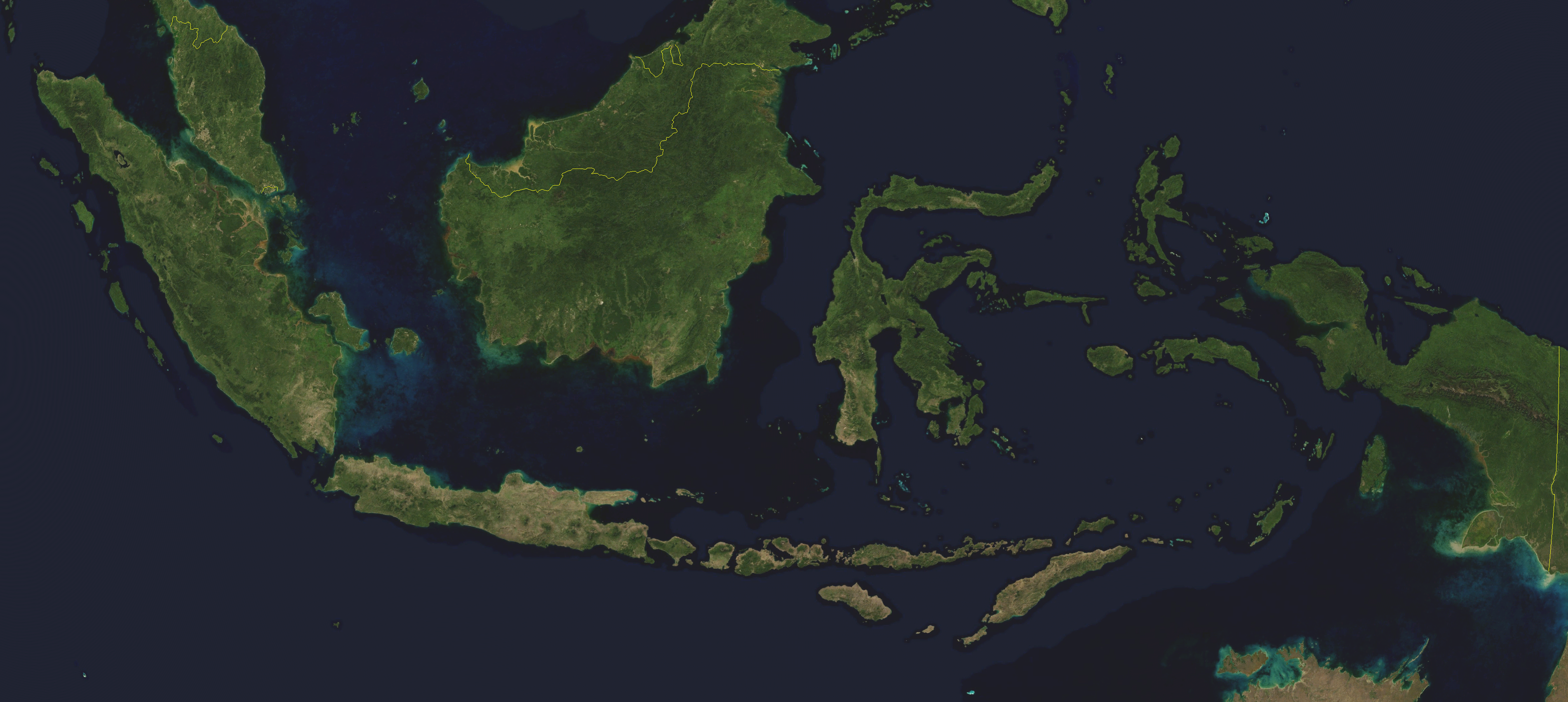
An enlargeable satellite composite image of Indonesia

- Climate of Indonesia
- Environmental issues in Indonesia
  - Deforestation in Indonesia
- Ecoregions in Indonesia
- Geology of Indonesia
  - Geology of Indonesia book (under preparation)
  - Earthquakes in Indonesia
  - Biosphere reserves in Indonesia
  - National parks of Indonesia
  - Volcanology of Indonesia
- Wildlife of Indonesia
  - Flora of Indonesia
  - Fauna of Indonesia
    - Birds of Indonesia
      - Endemic birds of Indonesia
    - Mammals of Indonesia

==== Natural geographic features of Indonesia ====
- Beaches in Indonesia
- Glaciers of Indonesia
- Islands of Indonesia
  - Sumatra Island – also spelled Sumatera, the sixth largest island in the world, largest island entirely in Indonesia
  - Borneo Island – known locally as Kalimantan, the third largest island in the world
  - New Guinea Island – also spelled Nugini, known locally as Papua, the second largest island in the world
  - Java Island – the most populated island in the world, the thirteenth largest island in the world
  - Celebes Island – known locally as Sulawesi, the eleventh largest island in the world
- Lakes of Indonesia
- Rivers of Indonesia
- Volcanoes in Indonesia
- List of World Heritage Sites in Indonesia

=== Administrative divisions of Indonesia ===
- 38 provinces of Indonesia (including six special autonomous provinces)
  - 98 cities of Indonesia (including five special administrative cities)
  - 415 regencies of Indonesia (including one special administrative regency)
    - 7,252 districts of Indonesia
      - 8,488 urban villages of Indonesia
      - 74,953 rural villages of Indonesia

==== Provinces of Indonesia ====

The provinces of Indonesia and their capitals, arranged by island or island group, are:
(Indonesian name in brackets where different from English)
† indicates provinces with Special Status

- Sumatra
  - Aceh^{†} - Banda Aceh
  - North Sumatra (Sumatera Utara) - Medan
  - West Sumatra (Sumatera Barat) - Padang
  - Riau - Pekanbaru
  - Riau Islands (Kepulauan Riau) - Tanjung Pinang
  - Jambi - Jambi (city)
  - South Sumatra (Sumatera Selatan) - Palembang
  - Bangka Belitung Islands (Kepulauan Bangka Belitung) - Pangkal Pinang
  - Bengkulu - Bengkulu (city)
  - Lampung - Bandar Lampung
- Java
  - Jakarta^{†} - Jakarta
  - Banten - Serang
  - West Java (Jawa Barat) - Bandung
  - Central Java (Jawa Tengah) - Semarang
  - Special Region of Yogyakarta^{†} (Daerah Istimewa Yogyakarta) - Yogyakarta (city)
  - East Java (Jawa Timur) - Surabaya
- Lesser Sunda Islands
  - Bali - Denpasar
  - West Nusa Tenggara (Nusa Tenggara Barat) - Mataram
  - East Nusa Tenggara (Nusa Tenggara Timur) - Kupang
- Kalimantan
  - West Kalimantan (Kalimantan Barat) - Pontianak
  - Central Kalimantan (Kalimantan Tengah) - Palangka Raya
  - South Kalimantan (Kalimantan Selatan) - Banjarmasin
  - East Kalimantan (Kalimantan Timur) - Samarinda
  - North Kalimantan (Kalimantan Utara) - Tanjung Selor
- Sulawesi
  - North Sulawesi (Sulawesi Utara) - Manado
  - Gorontalo - Gorontalo (city)
  - Central Sulawesi (Sulawesi Tengah) - Palu
  - West Sulawesi (Sulawesi Barat) - Mamuju
  - South Sulawesi (Sulawesi Selatan) - Makassar
  - Southeast Sulawesi (Sulawesi Tenggara) - Kendari
- Maluku Islands
  - Maluku - Ambon
  - North Maluku (Maluku Utara) - Sofifi
- Papua
  - West Papua^{†} (Papua Barat) - Manokwari
  - Central Papua^{†} (Papua Tengah) - Wanggar
  - South Papua^{†} (Papua Selatan) - Salor
  - Southwest Papua^{†} (Papua Barat Daya) - Sorong
  - Highland Papua^{†} (Papua Pegunungan) - Jayawijaya
  - Papua^{†} - Jayapura

==== Cities of Indonesia ====
- Capital of Indonesia: Jakarta

==== Regencies of Indonesia ====
To see the regencies of a province, click on its name.

=== Demography of Indonesia ===
- Ethnic groups in Indonesia
- Urbanization in Indonesia
- Women in Indonesia

== History of Indonesia ==
=== Prehistoric Indonesia ===
- Java Man
- Flores Man
- Toba eruption
- Buni culture

=== Indonesian monarchies ===
==== Hindu and Buddhist kingdoms ====
- Srivijaya (3rd–14th century)
- Tarumanagara (358–723)
- Sailendra (8th–9th century)
- Kingdom of Sunda (669–1579)
- Kingdom of Mataram (752–1045)
- Pagaruyung Kingdom (1347–1833)
- Kediri (1045–1221)
- Singhasari (1222–1292)
- Majapahit (1293–1500)

==== Islamic sultanates ====
- Ternate Sultanate (1257–1914)
- Malacca Sultanate (1400–1511)
- Cirebon Sultanate (1445–1677)
- Sultanate of Demak (1475–1518)
- Aceh Sultanate (1496–1903)
- Pagaruyung Kingdom (1500-1825)
- Johor-Riau Sultanate (1511-1911)
- Banten Sultanate (1526–1813)
- Mataram Sultanate (16th century to 18th century)

==== Christian kingdoms ====
- Kingdom of Larantuka (1515–1904)
- Kingdom of Bolaang Mongondow (1670–1950)

=== Chinese kongsi republics ===
- Kengwei Republic (1776–1854)
- Lanfang Republic (1777–1884)
- Santiaogou Republic (1777–1853)

=== European colonialism ===
- Portuguese colonialism in Indonesia (1512–1850)
- Dutch East India Company (1602–1800)
- Dutch East Indies (1800–1942)
- Anglo-Dutch Java War (1810–1811)
- Padri War (1821–1837)
- Java War (1825–1830)
- Aceh War (1873–1904)
- The Ethical Policy (1899–1942)

=== The emergence of Indonesia ===
- National Awakening (1899–1942)
- Japanese occupation (1942–1945)
- Proclamation of Independence (1945)
- National Revolution (1945–1950)
- Emergency Government of the Republic of Indonesia

=== Independent Indonesia ===
- Liberal Democracy (1950–1957)
- Guided Democracy (1957–1965)
- Start of the New Order (1965–1966)
- The New Order (1966–1998)
- Reform Era (1998–present)

== Government and politics of Indonesia ==
- Form of government: presidential multi-party representative democratic republic
- Capital of Indonesia: Jakarta
- Corruption in Indonesia
- Elections in Indonesia
  - Indonesian presidential elections
    - 2004
    - 2009
    - 2014
    - 2019
    - 2024
  - Indonesian parliamentary elections
    - 1955 (Sep)
    - 1955 (Dec)
    - 1971
    - 1977
    - 1982
    - 1987
    - 1992
    - 1997
    - 1999
    - 2004
    - 2009
    - 2014
  - Indonesian general elections
    - 2019
    - 2024
- Political parties in Indonesia
- Taxation in Indonesia
- Terrorism in Indonesia

=== Executive branch ===
- Head of state: President of Indonesia, Prabowo Subianto
- Head of government: President of Indonesia, Prabowo Subianto
  - Vice President of Indonesia, Gibran Rakabuming Raka
- Cabinet of Indonesia

=== Legislative branch ===
- People's Consultative Assembly (bicameral legislature)
  - Upper house: Regional Representative Council
  - Lower house: House of Representatives

=== Judicial branch ===
- Supreme Court of Indonesia
- Constitutional Court of Indonesia
- Judicial Commission of Indonesia

=== Foreign relations of Indonesia ===
- Diplomatic missions in Indonesia
- Diplomatic missions of Indonesia
- Indonesian ambassadors
- Embassy of Indonesia, Beijing
- Embassy of Indonesia, London
- Embassy of Indonesia, Moscow
- Embassy of Indonesia, Tokyo
- Embassy of Indonesia, Washington, D.C.
- CIA activities in Indonesia
- Foreign aid to Indonesia

==== International organization membership ====
The Republic of Indonesia is a member of:

- Asia-Pacific Economic Cooperation (APEC)
- Asia-Pacific Telecommunity (APT)
- Asian Development Bank (ADB)
- Asian Infrastructure Investment Bank (AIIB)
- Association of Southeast Asian Nations (ASEAN)
- Bank for International Settlements (BIS)
- Colombo Plan (CP)
- Comprehensive Nuclear-Test-Ban Treaty Organization (CTBTO)
- D-8 Organization for Economic Cooperation (D-8)
- East Asia Summit (EAS)
- Financial Action Task Force (FATF)
- Food and Agriculture Organization (FAO)
- Forum of East Asia–Latin America Cooperation (FEALAC)
- Group of 15 (G15)
- Group of 20 (G20)
- G20 developing nations
- Group of 77 (G77)
- Indian Ocean Rim Association (IORA)
- Indo-Pacific Economic Framework (IPEF)
- International Atomic Energy Agency (IAEA)
- International Bank for Reconstruction and Development (IBRD)
- International Chamber of Commerce (ICC)
- International Civil Aviation Organization (ICAO)
- International Criminal Police Organization (Interpol)
- International Development Association (IDA)
- International Federation of Red Cross and Red Crescent Societies (IFRCS)
- International Finance Corporation (IFC)
- International Fund for Agricultural Development (IFAD)
- International Hydrographic Organization (IHO)
- International Institute for the Unification of Private Law (UNIDROIT)
- International Labour Organization (ILO)
- International Maritime Organization (IMO)
- International Mobile Satellite Organization (IMSO)
- International Monetary Fund (IMF)
- International Olympic Committee (IOC)
- International Organization for Migration (IOM) (observer)
- International Organization for Standardization (ISO)
- International Paralympic Committee (IPC)
- International Red Cross and Red Crescent Movement
- International Seabed Authority (ISA)
- International Telecommunications Satellite Organization (ITSO)
- International Telecommunication Union (ITU)
- International Trade Union Confederation (ITUC)
- Inter-Parliamentary Union (IPU)
- Islamic Development Bank (IDB)
- Multilateral Investment Guarantee Agency (MIGA)
- Non-Aligned Movement (NAM)
- OPEC Fund for International Development (OPEC Fund)
- Organisation of Islamic Cooperation (OIC)
- Organisation for the Prohibition of Chemical Weapons (OPCW)
- United Nations (UN)
- United Nations–African Union Mission in Darfur (UNAMID)
- United Nations Conference on Trade and Development (UNCTAD)
- United Nations Economic and Social Commission for Asia and the Pacific (ESCAP)
- United Nations Educational, Scientific, and Cultural Organization (UNESCO)
- United Nations Industrial Development Organization (UNIDO)
- United Nations Interim Force in Lebanon (UNIFIL)
- United Nations Iraq–Kuwait Observation Mission (UNIKOM)
- United Nations Mission in Bosnia and Herzegovina (UNMIBH)
- United Nations Mission in Liberia (UNMIL)
- United Nations Mission in the Sudan (UNMIS)
- United Nations Mission of Observers in Prevlaka (UNMOP)
- United Nations Mission of Observers in Tajikistan (UNMOT)
- United Nations Observer Mission in Georgia (UNOMIG)
- United Nations Organization Stabilization Mission in the Democratic Republic of the Congo (MONUSCO)
- Universal Postal Union (UPU)
- World Confederation of Labour (WCL)
- World Customs Organization (WCO)
- World Federation of Trade Unions (WFTU)
- World Health Organization (WHO)
- World Intellectual Property Organization (WIPO)
- World Meteorological Organization (WMO)
- World Tourism Organization (UNWTO)
- World Trade Organization (WTO)

=== Law of Indonesia ===
- Atheism in Indonesian law
- Blasphemy law in Indonesia
- Cannabis in Indonesia
- Constitution of Indonesia
- Copyright law of Indonesia
- Crime in Indonesia
  - Corruption in Indonesia
  - Human trafficking in Indonesia
  - Piracy in Indonesia
  - Massacres in Indonesia
- Human rights in Indonesia
  - LGBT rights in Indonesia
  - Freedom of religion in Indonesia
  - Polygamy in Indonesia
  - Prostitution in Indonesia
- Law enforcement in Indonesia
- Patent office in Indonesia
- Penal system in Indonesia
  - Indonesian prisoners and detainees
  - Capital punishment in Indonesia
- Speed limits in Indonesia

=== Military of Indonesia ===
- Command
  - Commander-in-chief: President of Indonesia, Prabowo Subianto
    - Commander of the Indonesian National Armed Forces, Agus Subiyanto
    - Minister of Defense of Indonesia, Sjafrie Sjamsoeddin
- Forces
  - Army of Indonesia
  - Navy of Indonesia
  - Air Force of Indonesia
  - Special forces of Indonesia
- Military history of Indonesia
- Military ranks of Indonesia

== Culture of Indonesia ==
- Architecture of Indonesia
  - Architecture of Sumatra
  - Balinese architecture
  - Candi of Indonesia
  - Colonial architecture of Indonesia
  - Mosque architecture in Indonesia
  - Rumah adat
- Cuisine of Indonesia
- Cultural properties of Indonesia
- Customs of Indonesia
  - Etiquette in Indonesia
- Freemasonry in Indonesia
- Languages of Indonesia
  - Indonesian language
  - Endangered languages in Indonesia
- Media in Indonesia
  - Magazines published in Indonesia
  - Newspapers in Indonesia
- Mythology of Indonesia
- National costume of Indonesia
- National symbols of Indonesia
  - Coat of arms of Indonesia
  - Flag of Indonesia
  - National anthem of Indonesia: Indonesia Raya
- People of Indonesia
  - Names in Indonesia
  - National Heroes of Indonesia
  - Ethnic groups in Indonesia
- Philosophy of Indonesia
- UFO sightings in Indonesia
- Traditions of Indonesia
  - Festivals in Indonesia
  - Public holidays in Indonesia
- List of World Heritage Sites in Indonesia

=== Art in Indonesia ===
- Cinema of Indonesia
  - Indonesian films
- Dance in Indonesia
- Literature of Indonesia
  - Folklore of Indonesia
- Music of Indonesia
  - Indonesian musicians and musical groups
  - Indonesian pop musicians
- Museums and cultural institutions in Indonesia
  - National Museum of Indonesia
- Painting of Indonesia
- Theatre of Indonesia
- Television in Indonesia

=== Religion in Indonesia ===
- Buddhism in Indonesia
  - Candi of Indonesia
- Christianity in Indonesia
  - Bible translations into the languages of Indonesia and Malaysia
  - Protestantism in Indonesia
  - Roman Catholicism in Indonesia
  - Church buildings in Indonesia
    - Cathedrals in Indonesia
- Confucianism in Indonesia
- Hinduism in Indonesia
  - Hindu temples in Indonesia
- Islam in Indonesia
  - Spread of Islam in Indonesia
  - Ahmadiyya in Indonesia
  - Mosques in Indonesia
- Judaism in Indonesia
- Sikhism in Indonesia

=== Sports in Indonesia ===
- Badminton Association of Indonesia
- Football in Indonesia
  - Football Association of Indonesia
  - Football clubs in Indonesia
  - Football records in Indonesia
  - Women's football in Indonesia

== Economy and infrastructure of Indonesia ==
- Economic rank
- Economic issues in Indonesia
  - Poverty in Indonesia
- Agriculture in Indonesia
  - Aquaculture in Indonesia
  - Coconut production in Indonesia
  - Coffee production in Indonesia
  - Rice production in Indonesia
- Banks in Indonesia
  - Bank Indonesia – the central bank of Indonesia
- Communications in Indonesia
  - Internet in Indonesia
  - Telephone numbers in Indonesia
  - Television in Indonesia
  - Postage stamps and postal history of Indonesia
  - Postal codes in Indonesia
- Companies of Indonesia
- Currency of Indonesia: Rupiah
  - ISO 4217: IDR
- Energy in Indonesia
  - Nuclear power in Indonesia
  - Renewable energy in Indonesia
    - Geothermal power in Indonesia
- Health care in Indonesia
- Indonesia Stock Exchange
- Main infrastructure projects in Indonesia
- Mines in Indonesia
- Taxation in Indonesia
- Tourism in Indonesia
  - List of shopping malls in Indonesia
- Transport in Indonesia
  - Aviation in Indonesia
    - Airlines of Indonesia
    - Airports in Indonesia
  - Ports in Indonesia
  - Rail transport in Indonesia
    - Train stations in Indonesia
  - Road transport in Indonesia
    - Driving licence in Indonesia
    - Speed limits in Indonesia
    - Toll roads in Indonesia
    - Vehicle registration plates of Indonesia
- Water supply and sanitation in Indonesia

== Education in Indonesia ==
- Academic grading in Indonesia
- National Library of Indonesia
- Science and technology in Indonesia
- Medical schools in Indonesia
- Universities in Indonesia

== Health in Indonesia ==
- Health hazards
  - HIV/AIDS in Indonesia
  - Smoking in Indonesia

== See also ==
- Topic overview:
  - Indonesia
  - List of Indonesia-related topics
- Related outlines:
  - Outline of geography
  - Outline of Asia
  - Outline of Oceania
  - Outline of Jakarta
- Related topics:
  - List of international rankings
  - Member state of the Group of Twenty Finance Ministers and Central Bank Governors
  - Member state of the United Nations
  - Accusations of ExxonMobil human rights violations in Indonesia
  - Afflictions: Culture & Mental Illness in Indonesia
  - Agricultural Involution: The Processes of Ecological Change in Indonesia
  - Communist Party of Indonesia
  - Communist Party of Indonesia (Red)
  - Confederation of Indonesia Prosperous Trade Union
  - Constitutional Assembly of Indonesia
  - Government Investment Unit of Indonesia
  - International rankings of Indonesia
  - Islamic University of Indonesia
  - Kraft Foods Combat Malnutrition in Indonesia
  - Labour Party of Indonesia
  - Largest cities in Indonesia
  - City nicknames in Indonesia
  - English words of Indonesian origin
  - Female Cabinet Ministers of Indonesia
  - First Ladies and Gentlemen of Indonesia
  - Indonesia-related topics
  - Indonesia Super League hat-tricks
  - Indonesian-language poets
  - Indonesian acronyms and abbreviations
  - Indonesian agricultural universities and colleges
  - Indonesian ambassadors
  - Indonesian Ambassadors to Australia
  - Indonesian Ambassadors to Egypt
  - Indonesian Ambassadors to the United Kingdom
  - Indonesian Americans
  - Indonesian animal emblems
  - Indonesian composers
  - Indonesian dishes
  - Indonesian endemic animals
  - Indonesian endemic butterflies
  - Indonesian endemic freshwater fishes
  - Indonesian floral emblems
  - Indonesian football champions
  - Indonesian football competitions all-time top scorers
  - Indonesian Indos
  - Indonesian infantry battalions
  - Indonesian monarchies
  - Indonesian painters
  - Indonesian provinces by GRP per capita
  - Indonesian provinces by HDI
  - Indonesian records in swimming
  - Indonesian submissions for the Academy Award for Best Foreign Language Film
  - Indonesians
  - Indonesians by net worth
  - Loan words in Indonesian
  - Metropolitan areas in Indonesia
  - Ministers of Finance of Indonesia
  - Ministers of Law and Human Rights of Indonesia
  - National Parks of Indonesia
  - Power Stations in Indonesia
  - Presidents of Indonesia
  - Prime Ministers of Indonesia
  - Regencies and Cities of Indonesia
  - Roman Catholic Dioceses in Indonesia
  - Schools in Indonesia
  - Stadiums in Indonesia
  - Tallest Buildings in Indonesia
  - Tallest Structures in Indonesia
  - Television Stations in Indonesia
  - Terrorist Incidents in Indonesia
  - Twin Towns and Sister Cities in Indonesia
  - Vice Presidents of Indonesia
  - May 1998 riots of Indonesia
  - Military Ordinariate of Indonesia
  - Muria Christian Church in Indonesia
  - National Archives of Indonesia
  - National costume of Indonesia
  - National Emblem of Indonesia
  - National Paralympic Committee of Indonesia
  - National Sports Committee of Indonesia
  - National symbols of Indonesia
  - Orders, decorations, and medals of Indonesia
  - Peasants Front of Indonesia
  - Pentecostal Church in Indonesia
  - Permanent Representative of Indonesia to the United Nations
  - Proclamation of Indonesian Independence
  - Protected areas of Indonesia
  - Public holidays in Indonesia
  - Regions of Indonesia
  - Republic of the United States of Indonesia Cabinet
  - Revolutionary Government of the Republic of Indonesia
  - Shi'a Islam in Indonesia
  - Socialist Party of Indonesia
  - Socialist Party of Indonesia (Parsi)
  - Society of Actuaries of Indonesia
  - Specialty Coffee Association of Indonesia
  - The National Volleyball Federation of Indonesia
  - Time in Indonesia
  - Times of Indonesia
  - Union of Catholic University Students of the Republic of Indonesia
  - United States of Indonesia
  - University of Indonesia
  - Vice President of Indonesia
  - Visa policy of Indonesia
  - Voice of Indonesia
  - Volcanological Survey of Indonesia
