= Internet in Indonesia =

Before the era of internet business in Indonesia, internet connections could only be found at a few leading universities. By using UUCP, university servers in Indonesia exchange information with other university servers in the world through their respective gateways. In 1994, the internet business in Indonesia was started, marked by the granting of an internet service provider (ISP) company license issued by the Indonesian government to PT. Rahajasa Media Internet or RADNET.

== Usage ==
Based on OpenSignal in November 2016, there were only 58.8% of internet users in Indonesia who received 4G LTE signal, and received only HSPA+ signal or lower the rest of the time, ranking Indonesia 51st in the world. The download speed using 4G LTE in Indonesia was only an average of 8.79 Mbit/s (ranked 74th in the world).

Based on the Indonesia Internet Service Providers Association, in mid-2016, there were 132.7 million internet users, representing more than half of the Indonesian population. Only 3% of users are 50 years old or over, but surprisingly 100% in the 10–14 age bracket. Users on the island of Java dominated (65%), followed by Sumatra with 15.7 million users. Almost 90% of users were employees and students. Almost all of the users knew about e-commerce, but only 10.4 million users used the internet for transactions. Almost 70% of the users used their mobile phones for access.

According to eMarketer in 2014, Indonesia had 83.7 million users (in sixth place behind Japan), but Indonesia was predicted to surpass Japan in 2017, due to the slower growth rate in Japan compared to Indonesia.

According to Akamai Technologies, Indonesia, with nine connections to undersea cables, had in Q1 2014 an average Internet connection speed of 2.4 Mbit/s, which was an increase of 55% from the previous year. Just 6.6% of homes had access to 4 Mbit/s or higher speed connections. However, in Q4 2014, the average internet connection speed was 1.9 Mbit/s or dropped about 50% from Q3 2014 with 3.7 Mbit/s.

Based on the Indonesia Internet Service Providers Association, in Q4 2013, there were 71.19 million Internet users in Indonesia or about 28% of Indonesia's population. According to Cisco's Visual Networking Index, in 2013, Indonesia had the world's second-fastest growth of IP traffic and has become an "Internet of Everything" country.

Based on Communication Ministry data, at the end of June 2011, there were 45 million Internet users in Indonesia, of which 64% or 28 million users are between the ages of 15 and 19.

July 2011: Based on Nielsen's survey, 48% of Internet users in Indonesia used mobile phones for access, whereas another 13% used other handheld multimedia devices. It represents the highest dependence on mobile internet access in Southeast Asia, although Indonesia has the lowest level of overall internet penetration in the region with only 21% of Indonesians aged between 15 and 49 using the Internet.

According to a survey conducted by the Association of Internet Service Providers in Indonesia, the number of internet users in Indonesia reached 171.17 million at the beginning of 2019. The Indonesian government is eager to complete the Palapa Ring project, an undersea fiber-optic cable network across the country to offer affordable and faster internet access. It is expected to be fully completed by August 2019. The project comprises three sections – the west, central and east – that would span around 13,000 kilometers. It aims to expand domestic broadband service nationwide, particularly in the remote rural regions. The project is estimated to cost Rp 1.38 trillion (US$97.74 million) and would provide 4G access with speeds of up to 30 Mbit/s. In addition to connecting all of Indonesia in the telecommunications network, the Palapa Ring development is intended to reduce the gap in telecommunications services between Java and other regions in Indonesia.

May 2011: Based on TNS research, Indonesia has the world's second-largest number of Facebook users and the third-largest number of Twitter users. Eighty-seven percent of Indonesians have social networking site accounts, but only 14% access the sites daily, far below the global average of 46% due to access from old phones or inconvenient internet cafes. In line with the increase of cheap Android smartphones recently, there is the possibility that Indonesian internet user activity will increase as well.

Based on the Yahoo Net Index survey released in July 2011, the internet in Indonesia still ranks second after television in terms of media usage. Eighty-nine per cent of users were connected to social network, 72% used the internet for web browsing, and 61% read the news.

Indonesian Internet service providers (ISPs) offer service on PT Telkom's ADSL network. ADSL customers usually receive two separates bills, one for the ADSL line charges to PT Telkom and another for Internet service charges to the ISP.

== Mobile internet & telecommunications ==
All of the GSM major cellular telecommunication providers offer 3G, 3.5G HSDPA and 4G LTE, which cover cities and countrysides. They include Indosat, Telkomsel, Excelcomindo (XL) and 3. The usage of CDMA EV-DO has been phased out as the last provider, Smartfren, pulled its support in 2017 and converted to LTE-A. In 2016, almost all CDMA providers in Indonesia moved to either GSM or 4G LTE service such as Smartfren.

Due to COVID-19, Indonesia is adapting to digital transformation faster than predicted. The country is one of the striving mobile markets, underpinned by strong economic fundamentals, hence fast developing. With the population of the country, Indonesia is among the biggest market especially for smartphones along with China and India. 4G in Indonesia will continue to be the main network for mobile internet in Indonesia as 3G gradually resides over the years. The country is predicted by GSM Association to launch the new 5G network for commercial usage by 2022 and forecasted to have more than 20 million 5G connections by 2025.

Telkomsel launched 5G on 27 May 2021 in Jakarta and 8 other cities. Indosat have been given a permit to operate 5G networks, and will roll out 5G in four cities in Java and Sulawesi. Smartfren is currently testing mmWave 5G in its office.

== Censorship ==
Internet filtering in Indonesia was deemed "substantial" in the social arena, "selective" in the political and internet tools arenas, and there was no evidence of filtering in the conflict/security arena by the OpenNet Initiative in 2011 based on testing done during 2009 and 2010. Testing also showed that Internet filtering in Indonesia is unsystematic and inconsistent, illustrated by the differences found in the level of filtering between ISPs.

== Cyber army ==
The Indonesian Defence Ministry has proposed plans for creating a cyber army in order to protect the state's portals and websites. Though no law has been created in order to establish the cyber army, the ministry is seeking talented Internet security specialists who, upon hiring, could be trained in cyber-warfare.

== Domestic domain ==
Upon learning that about 80% of local internet traffic went abroad, the government began to encourage Indonesian institutions, business people and the public in general to use domestic domains. In mid-April 2015, there were about 20,000 .id domains and about 47,000 .co.id domains. The government targeted one million domestic domains with funding of Rp 50 billion ($3.85 million). Some users with non-domestic domains also possess domestic domains and redirect searches from its non-domestic domains to domestic domains.

== See also ==
- Communications in Indonesia
- Indonesia Internet Exchange
