= Academic grading in Indonesia =

The Indonesian grading system is an academic grading system utilized in Indonesia. It is based on a 1 to 100 point scale, similar to the Syrian grading system.

== Grade point scale ==
In Indonesia, a grade point scale is used. Before the adoption of Kurikulum Berbasis Kompetensi (Competency-Based Curriculum) in 2004, the grading scale used was:

Grade Point	Description	Notes
10.00	Excellent (Istimewa)	Highest grade; rarely given
9.00–9.99	Very Good (Baik Sekali)	Highest common grade
8.00–8.99	Good (Baik)	
7.00–7.99	Above Average (Lebih dari Cukup)	
6.00–6.99	Average (Cukup)	Lowest passing grade in general
5.00–5.99	Below Average (Hampir Cukup)	Highest failing grade for certain subjects (such as Theology, Mother Tongue/Indonesian Language, and Citizenship)
4.00–4.99	Deficient (Kurang)	Passing grade in some subjects, a failing grade in others
3.00–3.99	Very Deficient (Kurang Sekali)	Highest failing grade in general
2.00–2.99	Insufficient (Buruk)	Failing grade
1.00–1.99	Very Insufficient (Buruk Sekali)	Failing grade; lowest possible grade

After the Ministry of Education approved the use of Kurikulum Berbasis Kompetensi (Competency-Based Curriculum) in Indonesia, the grade point range was changed to a 0-100 scale. However, the passing score differs between one subject and another.

Grade Point	Notes
100	Highest point (rarely given)
75–99	Passing score in all subjects (above average)
55–74	Pass or fail grades differ between subjects. Some subjects use a score within this range as a passing score. For example, subject A requires a student to get more than 69 to pass while some subjects require students to have at least 56 (more than 55) to pass.
0–54	Student is considered failed and must take a remedial exam. The highest score obtainable in the remedial exam shall not exceed the lowest passing grade.
Note : A score of 70 is the minimal score to pass all grades in some schools during quarantine.

A student is to repeat a year if he or she earns a failing grade in any core subject (Mathematics, Indonesian Language, Religious Education, Science, Social Studies, Civics, Etc.) or if the student fails in more than two non-core subjects. (Local languages, etc.)

== Grade letter ==
Grading systems for universities are different. Grades are usually assigned in letters, following four-point system. Generally, Indonesian universities equate A with numerical value of 4.0 and E with 0.0. Some universities also employs intermediate grades such as A- and B+. This following list describes customary grade boundaries:

University Common I Letter Grade System
Grade Letter	Grade Point	Range	Description
A	4.00	85–100	Excellent/Very Good (Istimewa/Baik Sekali)
B	3.00	75–84	Good (Baik)
C	2.00	60–74	Average (Cukup)
D	1.00	50–59	Poor/Passed Conditionally (Kurang/Lulus Bersyarat)
E	0.00	0–49	Unsatisfactory (Gagal/Tidak Lulus)
K			Lack of requirements
T			Unavailable

University Common II Letter Grade System
Grade Letter	Grade Point	Equivalence
A	4.00	100.00
A-	3.67	91.75
B+	3.33	83.25
B	3.00	75.00
B-	2.67	66.75
C+	2.33	58.25
C	2.00	50.00
C-	1.67	41.75
D+	1.33	33.25
D	1.00	25.00
D-	0.67	16.75
E+	0.33	8.25
E	0.00	0.00

The lowest passing grade in an exam is usually D or 1 point and to be considered for graduation students must obtain a minimum cumulative GPA of 2.000.

Universities are free to (and hence, might) adopt different grading systems or standards at will. Some examples are:

Bandung Institute of Technology Letter Grade System
Grade Letter	Grade Point	Description
A	4.00	Very Good (Amat Baik)
AB	3.50	Between Good and Very Good (Antara Baik dan Amat Baik)
B	3.00	Good (Baik)
BC	2.50	Between Average and Good (Antara Cukup dan Baik)
C	2.00	Average (Cukup)
D	1.00	Below Average (Hampir Cukup)
E	0.00	Unsatisfactory (Gagal/Tidak Lulus)
T		Unavailable

Gadjah Mada University Letter Grade System
Grade Letter	Grade Point	% Equivalence
A	4.00	80.00–100.00
A-	3.75	77.50–79.99
A/B	3.50	75.00–77.49
B+	3.25	72.50–74.99
B	3.00	70.00–72.49
B-	2.75	67.50–69.99
B/C	2.50	65.00–67.49
C+	2.25	62.50–64.99
C	2.00	60.00–62.49
C-	1.75	57.50–59.99
C/D	1.50	55.00–57.49
D+	1.25	52.50–54.99
D	1.00	50.00–52.49
E	0.00	0.00–49.99
K
T

=== Latin honors grade equivalence ===
Latin Honors	Grade Point
Summa Cum Laude	3.900–4.000
Magna Cum Laude	3.760–3.890
Cum Laude	3.500–3.750
