= National symbols of Indonesia =

National symbols of Indonesia are symbols that represent Republic of Indonesia. It can represent Indonesia as a nation, Indonesian people, culture, arts, and its biodiversity. The official symbols of Indonesia are officially recognise symbols that represent Indonesia and enforced through Indonesian laws. These symbols of the state that represent Indonesian nationhood are Garuda Pancasila, Merah-Putih flag, Indonesia Raya national anthem, and Indonesian language.

Other than these official national symbols of Indonesia, there are also other symbols that widely recognise and accepted to represent Indonesia, yet does not necessarily being enforced by Indonesian laws. However some symbols that previously unofficially recognised and had not enforced by law finally gain official recognition through law edict, such as Indonesian national flora and fauna that enforced by law in 1993.

== Official national symbols ==
Garuda Pancasila, National symbol and emblem of Indonesia.

Official national symbols of Indonesia are national symbols of Indonesia that represent Indonesian nationhood. These symbols are recognised as official symbols that represent Republic of Indonesia and usually displayed in Indonesian government institution buildings, Indonesian embassies, Indonesian passport, or held by Indonesian representatives in international events, such as diplomatic or sporting events. These national symbols are enforced through Indonesian laws. The Constitution of Indonesia 1945 Chapter XV specifies the flag, official language, coat of arms, and national anthem of Indonesia. The Indonesian law No. 24 year 2009 mentioned about the Indonesian flag, Indonesian language, national emblem of Indonesia, and national anthem of Indonesia.

=== National emblem of Indonesia ===
Garuda Pancasila is the national emblem of Indonesia. It is an eagle- or hawk-like bird and the name of symbol derived from Garuda, the mythical bird vehicle of Vishnu, one of the principal deities of Hinduism. The current symbol are designed and officially recognised in 1950s. The Garuda's feathers represent the date of Indonesia's independence day which is 17 August 1945. The total feathers of the wings are 17 in each left and right wings. The total feathers in the tail are 8 and feathers of its neck are 45 in total. Indonesian national emblem is the Garuda with a heraldic shield on its chest and a scroll gripped by its leg. The shield's five emblems represent Pancasila, the five principles of Indonesia's national philosophy. Those five symbols of principle has its own meaning. First, the star in the middle symbolise sacred divinity, which means Indonesia is a state which is based on five recognised religions. Second, the chain with square and round links symbolises male and female as well as succession of generations of human beings that represent just and civilised humanity. Third, the big beringin (banyan tree) with multitude of branches, leaves and roots symbolises diversity of Indonesian people that belongs into one organism, symbolises unity of Indonesia, as well as strong and steady stance and protection under the tree's shade. Fourth, the head of a buffalo symbolises the people power or democracy, since water buffalo is the important domesticated animal in Indonesian agricultural culture. The last one, rice and cotton ears as main grain yields in Indonesia symbolise the fulfilments of humans needs of food and clothing which means prosperity. The Garuda claws gripping a white ribbon scroll inscribed with the national motto Bhinneka Tunggal Ika written in black text, which can be loosely translated as "Unity in Diversity". Garuda Pancasila was designed by Sultan Hamid II from Pontianak, supervised by Sukarno.

=== National motto ===
Bhinneka Tunggal Ika is the official national motto of Indonesia. The phrase is Old Javanese translated as "Unity in Diversity,". It is inscribed in the Indonesian national symbol, Garuda Pancasila (written on the scroll gripped by the Garuda's claws), and is mentioned specifically in article 36A of the Constitution of Indonesia.

It is a quotation from an Old Javanese poem Kakawin Sutasoma, written by Mpu Tantular during the reign of the Majapahit empire sometime in the 14th century. Kakawin contains epic poems written in metres. This poem is notable as it promotes tolerance between Hindus (Shivaites) and Buddhists.

=== Flag of Indonesia ===
The national flag of Indonesia, which is known as Sang Merah Putih ("The Red-and-White") in Indonesian, is based on the banner of the 13th century Majapahit Empire in East Java. The flag itself was introduced and hoisted in public at the Indonesian Independence Day ceremony, on 17 August 1945. The design of the flag has remained the same ever since.

=== National anthem of Indonesia ===
Indonesia Raya is the national anthem of the Republic of Indonesia. The song was introduced by its composer, Wage Rudolf Supratman, on 28 October 1928 during the Second Indonesian Youth Congress in Batavia. The song marked the birth of the all-archipelago nationalist movement in Indonesia that supported the idea of one single "Indonesia" as successor to the Dutch East Indies, rather than split into several colonies.

=== National language of Indonesia ===
Indonesian is the only official language of Indonesia, and Indonesia is the only country which uses this language as its official language. Since its inception in Youth Congress in 1928's Dutch East Indies, the function of Indonesian language is as the national identity, national pride, and unifying language among diverse Indonesian ethnic groups (which consist of more than 700 language groups), and also serves as communication vehicle among Indonesian from diverse provinces and different regional cultures in Indonesia.

=== National flora ===
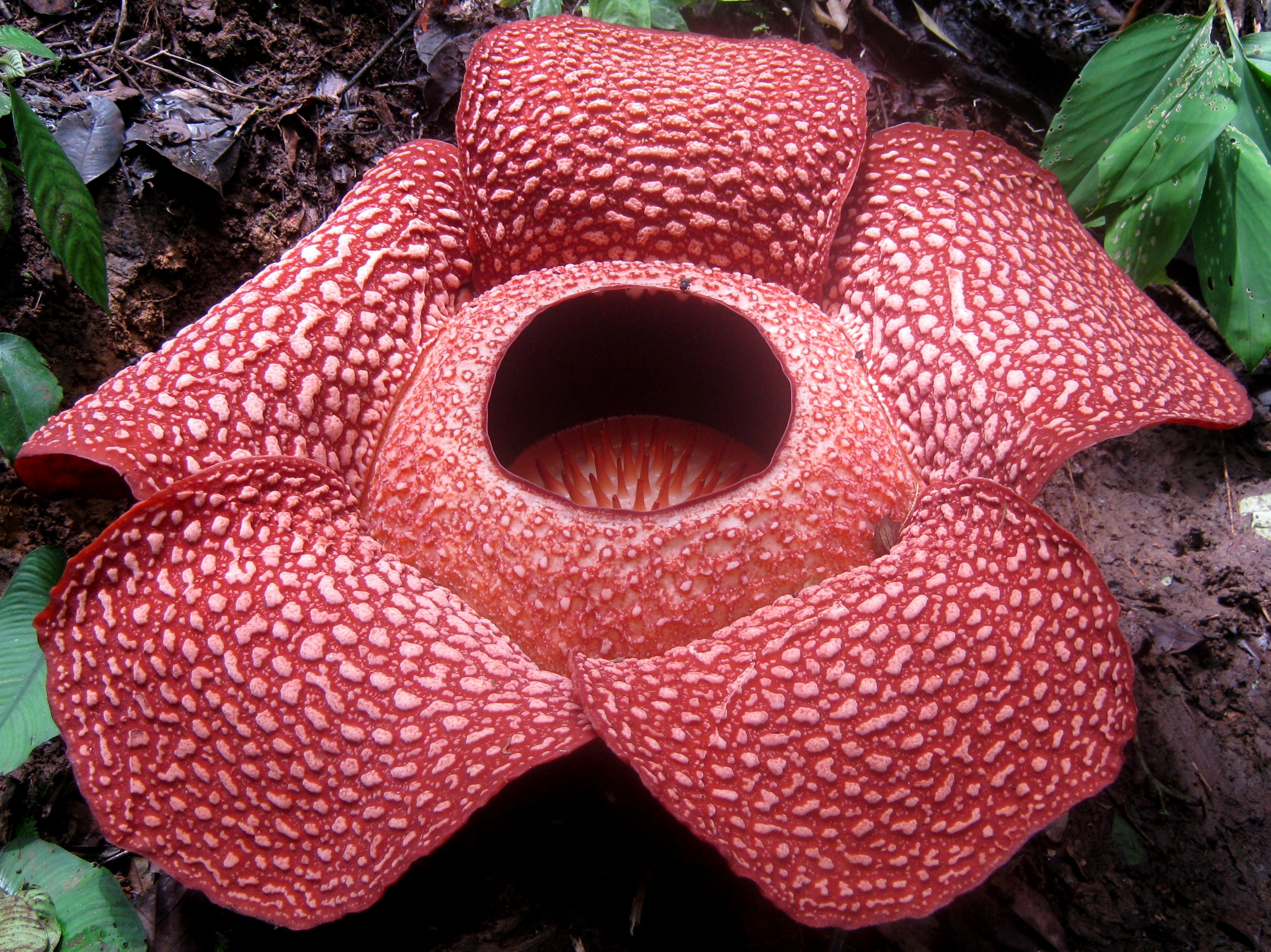
Rafflesia arnoldii, Floral Emblem of Indonesia.

There are three categories of floral emblem that symbolise Indonesia:

1. National flower (Indonesian: Puspa bangsa) of Indonesia is Melati putih (Jasminum sambac)
2. Flower of charm (Indonesian: Puspa pesona) is Anggrek Bulan (Moon Orchid) (Phalaenopsis amabilis)
3. Rare flower (Indonesian: Puspa langka) is Padma Raksasa Rafflesia (Rafflesia arnoldii). All three were chosen on World Environment Day in 1990. On the other occasion Bunga Bangkai (Titan arum) was also added as puspa langka together with Rafflesia.

=== National fauna ===
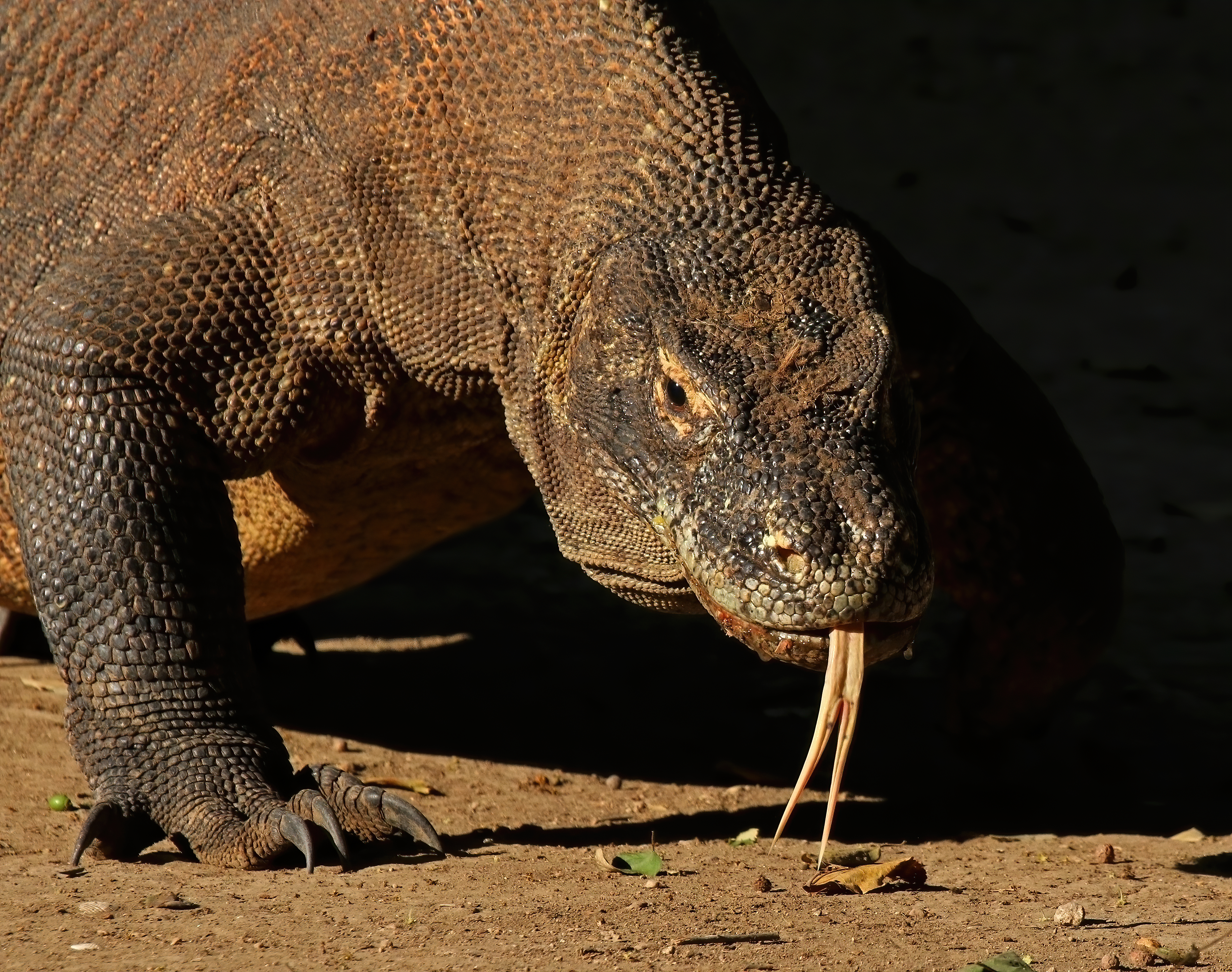
Komodo dragon, National Animal of Indonesia.

Indonesian animal emblems are Indonesian endemic fauna that gain the status as national animal symbol that represent Indonesia and describe Indonesian biodiversity. Today there are three animals that gained the status as Indonesian animal emblems:

1. The national animal (Indonesian: Satwa bangsa) of Indonesia is Komodo dragon (Varanus komodoensis)
2. A rare animal and national bird (Indonesian: Satwa langka) is Javan hawk-eagle (Nisaetus bartelsi)
3. the animal of charm (Indonesian: Satwa pesona) is Asian arowana (Scleropages aureus and Scleropages legendrei).

Next to national animal symbols, there are also more specific provincial animals emblems that represent each respective provinces of Indonesia.

=== National gem ===
Indonesia's national gem is Batu Intan (Diamond), especially Batu Intan from Martapura and Cempaka, Banjarbaru.

== Unofficial national symbols ==
Other than national symbols that officially represent Indonesia and enforced through law, there are also other symbols or icons that widely accepted to describes or represents Indonesia. It might derived from Indonesian monuments, the popular architectural landmarks of Indonesia, or it might be some of popular aspects of Indonesian culture.

=== National personification of Indonesia ===
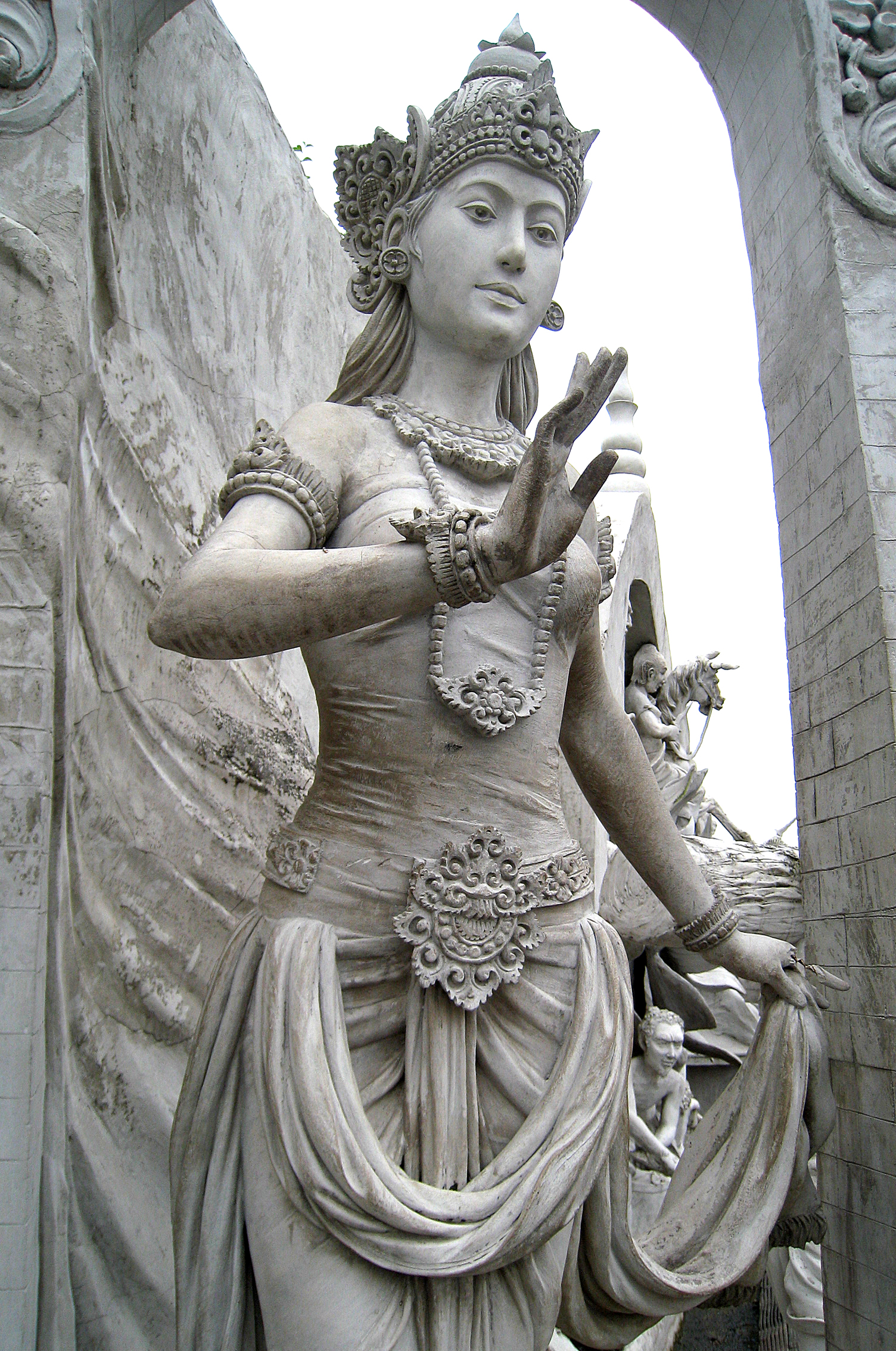
The image of a woman or a goddess in ancient regal attire at Indonesian National Monument, Jakarta. It is probably the popular depiction of Ibu Pertiwi in Indonesia.

Ibu Pertiwi (English: Mother Prithvi or Mother Earth) is a national personification of Indonesia, the allegory of Tanah Air (Indonesian: land and water), the Indonesian Motherland. Ibu Pertiwi is a popular theme in Indonesian patriotic songs and poems and was mentioned in several of them, such as the song "Ibu Pertiwi" and "Indonesia Pusaka" . In the national anthem "Indonesia Raya" the lyrics "Jadi pandu ibuku" ("Become the scout/guide for my mother") is a reference to Ibu Pertiwi as the mother of Indonesian people.

=== Nusantara (Indonesian archipelago) ===
Nusantara is an Indonesian word for the Indonesian archipelago. It is originated from Old Javanese "Nusa" and "Antara". "Nusa" literally means Island and "Antara" literally means "between". It is named like that because Indonesian archipelago is located between two continents (Asia and Australia) and two oceans (Pacific Ocean and Indian Ocean) The map of Indonesian archipelago often used to symbolise Indonesia, especially Indonesian territory.

=== National monuments ===
The National Monument

Borobudur is one of the famous landmark and monument designated as national symbol. It is an important architectural wonder and also World Heritage site recognised by UNESCO. However the monument that represent Indonesian nationhood is actually the Monas in Central Jakarta, although today it is mostly associated with the capital Jakarta instead. Other ancient temple of Prambanan also might be used as national symbol, although often overshadowed by Borobudur.

Other vernacular architectural features that often used to describe Indonesia are pagoda like multi-tiered Meru roof of Balinese temples, and traditional houses such as Minangkabau's Rumah Gadang and Torajan's Tongkonan.

=== National culture ===
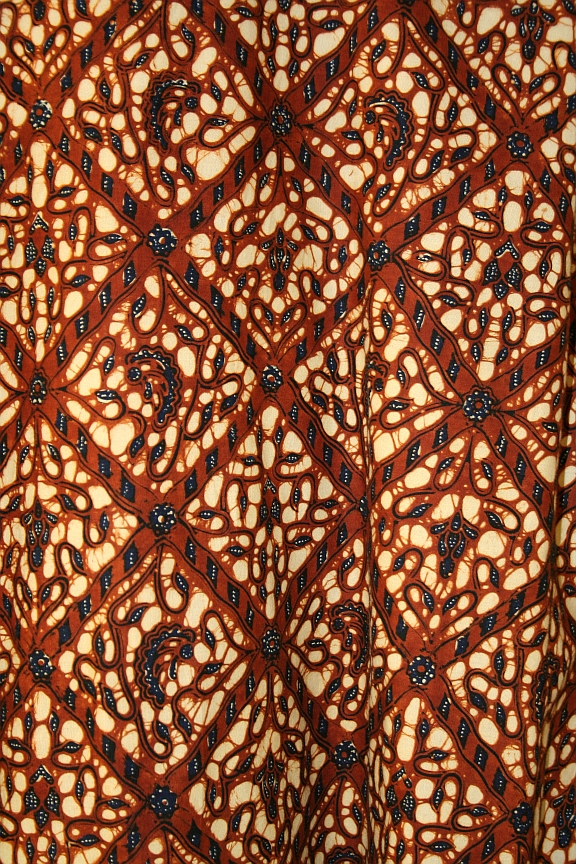
Batik, Indonesian traditional crafts

Some of traditional Indonesian culture, artworks, artforms, and traditions are often widely recognised and promoted to represent Indonesia. Some of popular Indonesian artforms are Balinese dance, Angklung, Wayang, Gamelan and Keris.

=== National costume ===
Batik, Kebaya and Songket are the most widely recognised Indonesian national costumes. These traditional costumes represent Indonesia and are derived from Indonesian culture and Indonesian traditional textile traditions. National costumes are worn during official national functions as well as during traditional ceremonies. The most obvious display of Indonesian national costumes can be seen by the type of costumes worn by President of Indonesia and Indonesian first lady, and also by Indonesian diplomatic officials during gala dinners. The national costumes of Indonesia are also worn by guests attending Indonesian traditional wedding ceremonies.

=== National dish ===
For the culturally and ethnically diverse nation such as Indonesia, the national dishes are not just staple, popular or ubiquitous dishes such as Nasi Goreng, Karedok or Gado-gado. It may also be considered as the dishes that transcend cultural and ethnics differences, yet still retain common Indonesian cuisine traits. It has to be able to cross boundaries of diverse Indonesian culture and ethnic groups. As a result, it is impossible to nominate a single national dish of Indonesia. Sate and Soto are good examples of Indonesian national dishes, since there is no singular satay or soto recipes. Both dishes have myriad variations and recipes and are adopted regionally across Indonesia.

== See also ==
- Outline of Indonesia
