= List of city nicknames in Indonesia =

This list of city nicknames in Indonesia compiles the aliases, sobriquets, and slogans that cities are known by (or have been known by historically), officially and unofficially, to municipal governments, local people, outsiders or their tourism boards.

== Sumatra ==
=== Aceh ===
- Banda Aceh
  - The Porch of Mecca (Serambi Mekkah)
- Lhokseumawe
  - Petrodollar City
  - Gas City
- Sabang
  - Kilometre zero of Indonesia
  - City of a Thousand Forts (Kota Seribu Benteng)
- Subulussalam
  - City of Worship
- Tapaktuan
  - Dragon City

=== Lampung ===
- Bandar Lampung
  - City of Elephants
  - Your Second Home

=== North Sumatra ===
- Berastagi
  - Town of Passion Fruit
- Binjai
  - City of Rambutans
- Kabanjahe
  - Town of Hills
  - Town of Oranges
- Medan
  - Capital of Sumatera
  - City of Thousand Angkots
  - City of Melayu Deli (Kota Melayu Deli)
  - Gotham City
  - Hub of Western Indonesia
  - Parijs van Sumatra
- Pangururan
  - Indonesian Great Lake (Indonesische Great Lake)
- Sidikalang
  - Town of Salaks
- Tanjungbalai
  - City of Clams
- Tebing Tinggi
  - City of Plantation

=== Riau ===
- Dumai
  - Port City
- Pekanbaru
  - City of Good Fortune

=== Riau Islands ===
- Batam
  - The Industrial City
  - The Business City

=== South Sumatra ===
- Palembang
  - City of Pempek (Kota Pempek)
  - The Land of Srivijaya (Bumi Sriwijaya)

=== West Sumatra ===
- Bukittinggi
  - City of Tri Arga
  - City of Jam Gadang
  - City of Tourism
- Padang
  - Beloved City (Kota Tercinta)
  - The Porch of Medina

== Java ==
=== Banten ===
- Cilegon
  - City of Steel
- Pandeglang
  - City of Rhinos
- Serang
  - City of Santri
- Tangerang
  - City of Factories

=== Jakarta ===
- Metropolitan City (Kota Metropolitan)
- Big Durian
- Enjoy Jakarta
- J-Town

=== Central Java ===
- Blora
  - City of Satay
- Demak
  - City of Wali
- Jepara
  - Bumi Kartini
  - The World Carving Center
  - The Beauty of Java
- Klaten
  - The Shine of Java
- Kudus
  - City of Kretek
  - The Taste of Java
- Lasem
  - City of Chinese
- Magelang
  - City of Getuk
  - City of Hope
  - City of Retirement
- Pekalongan
  - City of Batik
- Purbalingga
  - City of Kayak
- Purwokerto
  - City of Kripik
  - Education City
  - Knight City
  - Transit City
- Purworejo
  - City of Scouting
- Semarang
  - Charm of Asia (Pesona Asia)
  - City of Lumpia
  - City of Jamu
  - Venice of Java (Venetië van Java)
- Surakarta
  - City of Culture
  - City of Liwet
  - Capital of Batik
  - The Spirit of Java
- Tegal
  - Ocean City

=== East Java ===
- Bangkalan
  - Land of Dhikr and Salawat (Bumi Dzikir dan Sholawat)
  - Land of Sakera (Bumi Sakera)
- Banyuwangi
  - Land of the Blambangan (Bumi Blambangan)
  - City of Gandrung (Kota Gandrung)
  - Land of Badar Salawat (Bumi Sholawat Badar)
  - City of Osing (Kota Using)
  - The Sunrise of Java
- Batu (city)
  - Switzerland of Java (Zwitserland van Java)
- Blitar
  - Land of Dude Karno (Bumi Bung Karno)
  - The Land of Kings
- Blitar (city)
  - City of Patria (Kota Patria)
  - City of the Proclaimers (Kota Proklamator)
  - City of Koi (Kota Koi)
- Bojonegoro
  - City of Ledre (Kota Ledre)
  - City of Teaks (Kota Jati)
  - City of Tayub (Kota Tayub)
  - Land of Angling Dharma (Bumi Angling Dharma)
- Bondowoso
  - Tape City (Kota Tape)
  - Land of Burdah Salawat (Bumi Sholawat Burdah)
  - Megalithic City (Kota Megalitikum)
  - Land of Ki Ronggo (Bumi Ki Ronggo)
- Gresik
  - City of Pudak (Kota Pudak)
  - City of Cement (Kota Semen)
- Jember
  - City of Carnivals (Kota Karnaval)
  - City of Suwar-Suwir (Kota Suwar-Suwir)
  - Land of Pandalungan (Bumi Pandhalungan)
  - City of a Thousand Humps (Kota Seribu Gumuk)
- Jombang
  - City of Faith (Kota Beriman)
  - City of Tolerance (Kota Toleransi)
- Kediri
  - Land of Panji (Bumi Panji)
- Kediri (city)
  - City of Manufacture (Kota Industri)
- Lamongan
  - City of Soto (Kota Soto)
  - City of Catfish (Kota Lele)
  - Land of Joko Tingkir (Bumi Joko Tingkir)
- Lumajang
  - City of Bananas (Kota Pisang)
  - Austria of Java (Oostenrijk van Java)
  - Land of Menak Koncar (Bumi Menak Koncar)
- Madiun
  - Martial Arts Village (Kampung Pesilat)
- Madiun (city)
  - City of Girls (Kota Gadis)
  - City of Brem (Kota Brem)
  - City of Pecel (Kota Pecel)
  - Train City (Kota Kereta)
  - Charismatic City (Kota Karismatik)
  - City of Warriors (Kota Pendekar)
  - Milan of Java (Milan van Java)
- Magetan
  - City of Foothills (Kota Kaki Gunung)
  - The Sunset of East Java
  - The Nice of Java
- Malang
  - Regency of a Thousand Beaches (Kabupaten Seribu Pantai)
  - Land of Kanjuruhan (Bumi Kanjuruhan)
  - Regency of Rabbits (Kabupaten Kelinci)
  - Land of Girindhra (Bumi Girindhra)
- Malang (city)
  - City of Apples (Kota Apel)
  - El Dorado of East Java (Het Dorado van Oost-Java)
  - Land of Arema (Bumi Arema)
  - Paris of East Java
- Mojokerto
  - Land of the Majapahit (Bumi Majapahit)
  - Land of Palapa Oath (Bumi Amukti Palapa)
- Mojokerto (city)
  - City of Sesame Balls (Kota Onde-Onde)
- Nganjuk
  - Land of the Anjuk Ladang (Bumi Anjuk Ladang)
  - City of Wind (Kota Angin)
  - City of Shallots (Kota Bawang)
- Ngawi
  - Friendly City (Kota Ramah)
  - City of Bamboos (Kota Bambu)
  - Fortress City (Kota Benteng)
  - City of Tempeh Chips (Kota Kripik Tempe)
- Pacitan
  - City of 1001 Caves (Kota 1001 Gua)
- Pamekasan
  - Land of Peace Gates (Bumi Gerbang Salam)
  - Land of Ronggosukowati (Bumi Ronggosukowati)
- Pasuruan
  - Land of Untung Surapati (Bumi Untung Suropati)
  - Land of Tenggerese (Bumi Tengger)
- Pasuruan (city)
  - Medina of Java (Medina van Java)
- Ponorogo
  - Land of Reog (Bumi Reog)
- Probolinggo
  - Land of Bayuangga (Bumi Bayuangga)
- Probolinggo (city)
  - City of Grapes (Kota Anggur)
  - City of Mangoes (Kota Mangga)
  - Land of the Banger (Bumi Banger)
- Sampang
  - Land of Nautical (Bumi Bahari)
  - Land of Trunajaya (Bumi Trunojoyo)
- Sidoarjo
  - City of Delta (Kota Delta)
  - City of Shrimps and Milkfishs (Kota Udang dan Bandeng)
  - City of Petis (Kota Petis)
  - Land of Janggala (Bumi Jenggala)
- Situbondo
  - City of Bird's Paradise (Kota Surga Burung)
  - Africa of Java (Afrika van Java)
  - Land of Nariyah Salawat (Bumi Sholawat Nariyah)
  - East Side of Paradise
- Sumenep
  - Land of the Sumekar (Bumi Sumekar)
  - Kris City (Kota Keris)
  - Solo of Madura (Solo-nya Madura)
  - Land of Salt (Bumi Garam)
  - Jogja of Madura (Jogja-nya Madura)
  - Land of Jokotole (Bumi Jokotole)
  - Bekisar City (Kota Bekisar)
  - The Flying Horse (Kuda Terbang)
  - Madurese Dangdut City (Kota Dangdut Madura)
  - Land of Arya Wiraraja (Bumi Arya Wiraraja)
  - Jewel of Madura (Permata-nya Madura)
  - Kraton City (Kota Keraton)
  - Pearl of Madura's Orient (Mutiara dari Ujung Timur Madura)
  - Beach Sheoak City (Kota Cemara Udang)
  - Bastion of Madurese Culture (Benteng Budaya Madura)
- Surabaya (city)
  - City of Heroes (Kota Pahlawan)
  - City of the Brave
- Trenggalek
  - City of Gaplek (Kota Gaplek)
  - City of Alen-Alen (Kota Alen-Alen)
  - Land of Menak Sopal (Bumi Menak Sopal)
- Tuban
  - Land of Saints (Bumi Wali)
  - City of Koes Plus (Kota Koes Plus)
  - Land of Ronggolawe (Bumi Ronggolawe)
  - City of Neera (Kota Legen)
  - The Mid-East of Java
- Tulungagung
  - City of Marble (Kota Marmer)
  - Sweden of Java (Zweden van Java)

=== West Java ===
- Bandung
  - City of Creativity
  - City of Fashion
  - City of Flowers (Kota Kembang)
  - Everlasting Beauty
  - Paris of Java (Parijs van Java)
- Bekasi
  - City of the Patriots
  - City of Pancasila
- Bogor
  - City of Rain/Rain City (Kota Hujan)
  - Storm City
  - City of Pakuan Padjajaran
  - City of a Thousand Angkots (Kota Seribu Angkot)
- Cianjur
  - City of Rooster
- Cikampek
  - Industrial City
- Cikarang
  - Detroit van Java
  - Indonesia's Automotive City
- Cimahi
  - Cyber City
- Cirebon
  - City of Shrimps (Kota Udang)
- Garut
  - City of Dodol
  - City of Sheeps
- Indramayu
  - City of Mangoes
- Karawang
  - The Base of Struggle (Pangkal Perjuangan)
- Majalengka
  - Windy City
- Subang
  - City of Lions
  - Silicon Valley van Java
- Sukabumi
  - City of Santri
- Sumedang
  - City of Tofu

=== Yogyakarta ===
- Yogyakarta
  - City of Artistry
  - City of Gudeg
  - City of Scholars
  - City of Students (Kota Pelajar)
  - Never Ending Asia

== Lesser Sunda Islands ==
=== Bali ===
- Denpasar
  - City of Children
- Ubud
  - Cultural Capital of Bali
  - City of Arts

=== West Nusa Tenggara ===
- Mataram
  - City of Thousand Mosques
  - Water City

=== East Nusa Tenggara ===
- Labuan Bajo
  - City of Dragons
- Kupang
  - City of Love (Kota Kasih)
- Oelmasi
  - City of Stone Mountains
- Ruteng
  - City of a Thousand Churches
  - City of Horses

== Kalimantan ==
=== East Kalimantan ===
- Balikpapan
  - Oil City (Kota Minyak)
- Bontang
  - Garden City
- Samarinda
  - Queen of Mahakam
- Tarakan
  - Little Singapore
- Tenggarong
  - City of Kings

=== Central Kalimantan ===
- Palangkaraya
  - Beautiful City

=== South Kalimantan ===
- Banjarmasin
  - City of a Thousand Rivers
  - Venice of Nusantara
- Martapura
  - City of Diamond

=== West Kalimantan ===
- Pontianak
  - Equator City (Kota Khatulistiwa)
- Putussibau
  - Heart of Borneo
- Singkawang
  - City of a Thousand Temples
  - City of Amoy

== Sulawesi ==
=== Central Sulawesi ===
- Toli-toli
  - City of Cloves

=== Gorontalo ===
- Gorontalo
  - The Veranda of Medina (Serambi Madinah)

=== North Sulawesi ===
- Manado
  - City of Tinutuan (Kota Tinutuan)
  - City of Waving Palm Trees
- Tomohon
  - City of Flowers

=== South Sulawesi ===
- Bulukumba
  - City of Pinisi
- Makassar
  - Great Expectation
  - City of Daeng (Kota Daeng)
  - City of Mamiri Winds (Kota Angin Mamiri)

=== Southeast Sulawesi ===
- Baubau
  - Land of Fragrance (Bumi Semerbak)
  - City of Pineapples

== Maluku Islands and Western New Guinea ==
=== Maluku ===
- Ambon
  - Ambon Manise
  - Music City
- Tual
  - City of Pearl

=== North Maluku ===
- Ternate
  - City of Spices
  - City of Forts

=== Papua ===
- Biak
  - City of Reefs
- Jayapura
  - City of Black Pearl

=== South Papua ===
- Merauke
  - City of Deers

=== Southwest Papua ===
- Raja Ampat
  - The Paradise of Papua
- Sorong
  - Oil City

=== West Papua ===
- Fakfak
  - City of Nutmeg
- Kaimana
  - Twilight City
- Manokwari
  - City of Gospel

== See also ==
- Lists of nicknames – nickname list articles on Wikipedia
