= Cannabis in Indonesia =

- Location of Indonesia (dark green)
- Medicinal: Illegal
- Recreational: Illegal
- Hemp: Illegal

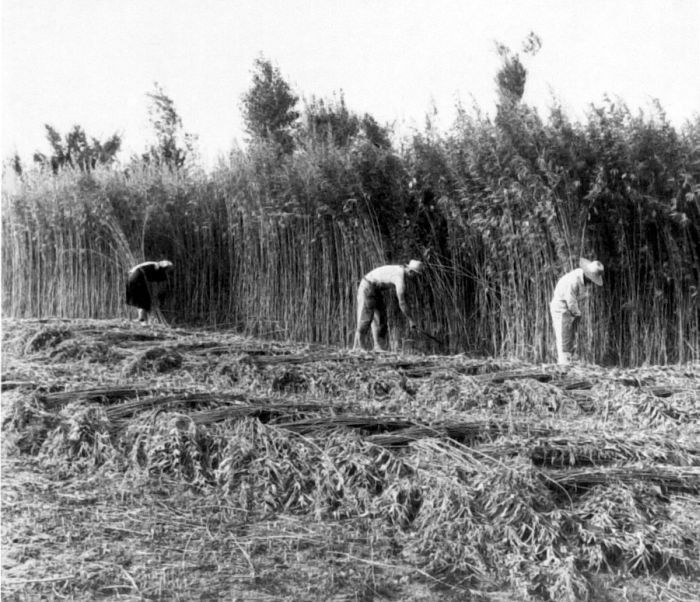
Farmers harvesting cannabis, c. 1880s

Cannabis is illegal in Indonesia. Cannabis plants, all plants of the Cannabis genus and all parts of plants including seeds, fruit, straw, and processed cannabis plants or parts of cannabis plants including marijuana resin and hash are categorized as narcotics group. Drug offenders are subject to a minimum sentence of four years in prison (additional fines may apply) if caught possessing it. Derivatives of medical and recreational cannabis (such as hemp, CBD, tetrahydrocannabinol, hashish, and edibles) are also illegal.

Cannabis use have been reported to as early as the 10th century in Java and Aceh. In 1927, the drug was banned by the Dutch colonial government. After Indonesian independence, the drug remained illegal, with it being the subject of a large anti-drug and anti-narcotics campaign since the 1970s. Cannabis is currently the most widely used illicit substance in Indonesia, with approximately two million users in 2014. Under the current narcotics law cannabis is included as one of the most restrictive substances regulated by the government, along with substances such as heroin, and crystal meth (known in Indonesia as shabu or sabu-sabu).

== History ==
=== Early history ===
Cannabis was reported to have been used in as early as the 10th century in the island of Java. Likely used as a source of fibre and an intoxicant, although its use was not as common as other drugs such as tobacco, opium or betel. Traditional use of cannabis have also been found in northern part of Sumatra, more specifically in Aceh, with cannabis serving as an "intoxicating agent" whose leaves were regularly mixed and smoked with tobacco. While more commonly grown in Aceh and northern Sumatra, there is evidence that suggests that cannabis was also grown in other parts of the Dutch East Indies such as in Batavia (now Jakarta), Buitenzorg (now Bogor) and Ambon. In Ambon specifically, cannabis roots were consumed to treat gonorrhoea, while its leaves were brewed as tea to alleviate asthma and pleuritic chest pain. German-Dutch botanist, G. E. Rumphius observed that among Muslims, cannabis leaves, which were smoked with tobacco, produced effects varying from aggression to sadness and melancholy. Occasionally, advertisements for cannabis appeared in the Indies sometime in the late 19th century. These advertisements attempted to promote cannabis cigarettes as remedies for illnesses. Though, they were mostly targeted to Europeans.

=== Prohibition ===
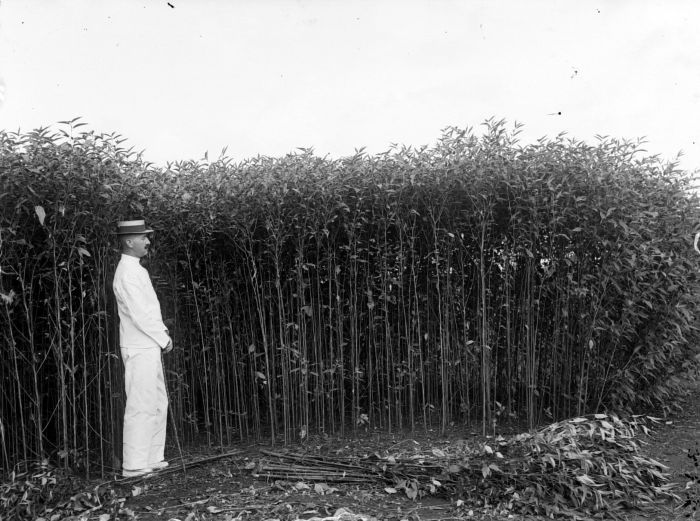
A man of European-descent standing in front of a hemp field

Concerns over the use cannabis were raised at the First International Opium Convention in 1912 in The Hague. An addendum to 1912 International Opium Convention was added in which "[t]he Conference considers it desirable to study the question of Indian hemp from the statistical and scientific point of view, with the object of regulating its abuses, should the necessity thereof be felt, by international legislation or by an international agreement." The colonial government soon instructed Willem G. Boorsma, Head of the Pharmacological Laboratory of the Department of Agriculture, Industry and Trade in the Dutch East Indies, to examine the situation of cannabis in the Dutch East Indies. The study conducted by Boorsma did not show significant problems relation to cannabis use in the Indies. As a result no measures were introduced to stop cannabis cultivation, though increased scrutiny were placed upon head administrators of the regions where the plant was found.

Despite Boorsma's study, the Dutch government decided to restrict access to cannabis in the Dutch East Indies through the adoption of the Verdovende Middellen Ordonnantie (Decree on Narcotic Drugs) of 1927. This was likely due to the inclusion of cannabis in the Second International Opium Convention of 1925 and made cannabis subject to a system of export authorizations and import certificates. The decree prohibited the cultivation, import and export, production and use of narcotic drugs, except for medical and scientific purposes with prior government authorization.

=== Post-independence ===
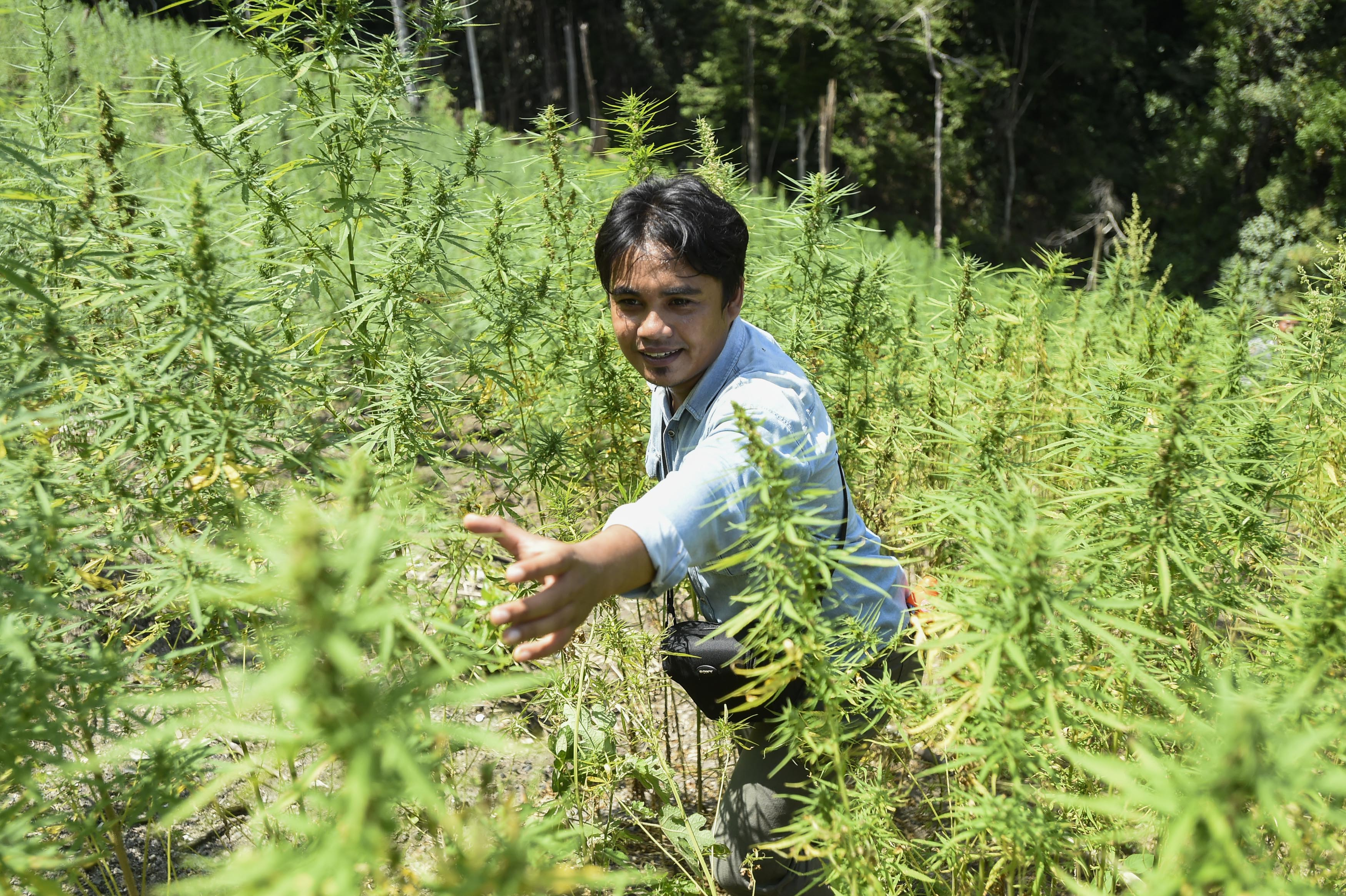
Marijuana fields in Aceh Besar Regency, the northern tip of Aceh, Sumatra.

After the end of Dutch rule and the independence of Indonesia following the National Revolution, the new Indonesian government under president Sukarno kept the old colonial regulations regarding cannabis. Fifteen years following the 1961 UN Single Convention on Narcotic Drugs, the Indonesian government passed a set of laws with regard to the use of psychoactive substances, including cannabis. The anti-narcotics law passed in 1976, however, did not entail any categorization of substances, describing the cannabis plant as a type of narcotic which can be restrictively used for medical and research purposes only.

During the late 1970's the separatist Free Aceh Movement (GAM), which was a separatist group seeking independence for the Aceh region, began the illicit cultivation of cannabis in the region. The group allegedly financed itself by levying taxes on cannabis cultivation and controlling trafficking in cooperation with a Jakarta-based trafficking organization. In the late 1980s, a GAM sub-district commander was arrested and reported to have shown hectares of cannabis fields connected with the funding of GAM operations, although there have been doubts about the validity of these "confessions." In response to this, the Indonesian military was ordered to carry out the Nila I Operation in 1989, a military operation which appeared to aim for the abolition of GAM and the cultivation of cannabis in Aceh. Subsequent attacks by GAM were deemed as forms of retaliation towards such eradication programs by the Indonesian authorities.

== Timeline ==
The following is a timeline of the legal status of cannabis in Indonesia :

- 1927 : Verdovende Middellen Ordonnantie (Decree on Narcotic Drugs) is passed, restricting the import, export, cultivation, possession, preparation and use of cannabis.
- 1976 : Law No. 9 Year 1976 on Narcotics is passed, restricting use of cannabis for medical and research purposes only.
- 1997 : Law No. 22 Year 1997 on Narcotics is passed, restricting use of cannabis for research purposes only.
- 2009 : Law No. 35 Year 2009 on Narcotics is passed, restricting use of cannabis for research purposes only.

== Law on cannabis ==
=== Punishment ===
According to the Law No. 35 Year 2009 on Narcotics, the punishment for cannabis related offenses are :

1. Personal use: maximum 4-year prison sentence and/or mandatory rehabilitation (Article 127).
2. Possession, cultivation, and supply provision: 4-12-year prison sentence and a fine between Rp 800 million – 8 billion.
3. Cultivation of more than 1 kg (2 lb) or 5 plants: 5-20-year prison or life sentence with a higher amount of fines (Article 111).
4. Production, imports, exports, and distribution: 5-15-year prison sentence and a fine between Rp 1 – 10 billion.
5. In the case of more than 1 kg (2 lb) or 5 plants: death penalty, life imprisonment or 5-20-year prison sentence with a fine higher than Rp 10 billion (Article 113).
6. Sales and purchases for dealing purposes: 5-20-year prison or life sentence and a fine between Rp 1-10 billion.
7. In the case of more than 1 kg (2 lb) or 5 plants: death penalty, life imprisonment or 6-20-year prison sentence with a fine higher than Rp 10 billion (Article 114).
8. Transporting: 4-12-year prison or life sentence and a fine between Rp 800 million – 8 billion.
9. In the case of more than 1 kg (2 lb) or 5 plants: life imprisonment or 5-20-year prison sentence with a fine higher than Rp 8 billion (Article 115).
10. Provision of drugs to others: 5-15-year prison sentence and a fine of Rp 1 – 10 billion.
11. Provision which leads to permanent injuries/deaths: death penalty, life imprisonment or 5-20-year of prison and fine higher than Rp 10 billion (Article 116).

The latest 2023 criminal code, punished anyone who mass produced the drug plants including cannabis with death.

== Legal challenge ==
The legal status of cannabis was challenged in the Constitutional Court by a group of citizens in 2020. The plaintiffs wanted to have cannabis removed from the narcotics list and given the status of a medical substance. On 20 July 2022, the Constitutional Court rejected Case No. 106/PUU-XX/2020 owing to the paucity of data supporting the claimants' case, claiming that the law could not change on the basis of research that had not been conducted in Indonesia. The decision did, however, order the government and legislators to advance research on cannabis in Indonesia to assess its potential uses. The Constitutional Court's decision was supported by the National Narcotics Agency. The plaintiffs, while they accept the decision, nevertheless continue to advocate for the legalisation of cannabis and push for the government to advance cannabis research in Indonesia.
