= Patent office in Indonesia =

In Indonesia, the Patent Office (Direktorat Jenderal Kekayaan Intelektual, "Directorate General of Intellectual Property") is a governmental agency overseeing intellectual property rights (HKI). A public body carrying out this function has existed since Dutch colonial times. Its name and organizational structure have changed several times since independence.

== History ==
The first trademark was registered by the "Assistance Office for Industrial Property" (Dutch: Hulpbureau Voor den Industrieelen Eigendom) on January 10, 1894, in Batavia. Based on Reglement Industrieelen Eigendom 1912 Stbl.1912-545 jo 1913-214, Hulpbureau Voor den Industrieelen Eigendom was an institution under the Department of Justice that registered trademarks in Indonesia. From then on, based on Stbl. 1924 no. 576 ayat 2, the tasks and duties of Department of Justice covered industrial property ownership.

When the Republic of Indonesia became independent in 1945, in accordance with the constitution of that year, pasal II of temporary provision, Stbl. 1924 no. 576 remained valid and the name of the office was changed to Office of Craft Ownership. In 1947, the Office of Craft Ownership moved to Surakarta and on October 9, 1947, its name changed to Office of Industry Ownership.

In the period of the United States of Indonesia (RIS), 1949–50, the Office of Industry Ownership moved to Jakarta. Based on Government Regulation no. 60 th. 1948 covering the structure, management, tasks and duties of the Ministry of Justice, the Office of Industry Ownership comprised the Department of Trademark Registration and the Department of Innovation Protection (Octrooi).

Based on the Decision of Minister of Justice on February 12, 1964, no. J.S. 4/4/4 about Duties and Organization of Justice Department (completed by the decision of Minister of Justice on June 27, 1965, no. J.S. 4/4/24), the name of the Office of Industry Ownership became The Directorate of Patent Affairs, with responsibility for regulating the protection of inventions and innovations. Thus the General Directorate of Patent now not only dealt with trademarks and patents, but also with copyright.

In 1966, Cabinet Presidium gave a decision no. 75/U/Kep/11/1966 about the department's organizational structure and apportionment of tasks. The Directorate of Patent Affairs now became the Directorate of Patent, General Directorate of Justice and Constitution Management, which consisted of the Trademark Registration Service, the Patent Service, and the Copyright Service.

In 1969, by the Decision Of President, no. 39/th.1969, the General Directorate of Justice was formed. By this measure, General Directorate of Justice and Constitution Management was split to form the General Directorate of Justice Management and the General Directorate of Law Restoration which included the Directorate of Patent. The General Directorate of Law Restoration underwent a change to its organizational structure in accordance with the Decision of President of Republic of Indonesia no. 45.

Both of those decisions resulted in some changes, and they were later simplified by the Decision of Minister of Justice on April 16, 1976, no. Y.S. 4/3/7. In 1975, the Directorate of Patent changed to become the Directorate of Patent and Copyright under the General Directorate of Law and Constitutions.

== Organizational structure ==
- Department of Administration
- Sub Directorate of Trademarks
- Sub Directorate of Patent
- Sub Directorate of Copyright
- Sub Directorate of Commercial Law & Industry
- Sub Registration of License and Announcement
