= Tower Bersama Infrastructure =

Telecommunication tower provider in Indonesia

- Type: Public IDX: TBIG
- Industry: Diversified Communication Services
- Founded: 2003
- Headquarters: Jakarta, Indonesia,
- Key people: Herman Setya Budi, CEO; Edwin Soeryadjaya, President Commissioner
- Revenue: ▲ Rp 4.698 trillion (2019)
- Net income: ▲ Rp 866.1 billion (2019)
- Total assets: ▲ Rp 30.871 trillion (2019)
- Total equity: ▲ Rp 4.993 trillion (2019)
- Parent: Saratoga Investama Sedaya; Provident Capital
- Subsidiaries: Permata Karya Perdana; Gihon Telekomunikasi; Visi Telekomunikasi Infrastruktur; United Towerindo; Telenet Internusa; Solusi Menara Indonesia; TBG Global Pte Limited; Tower One; Metric Solusi Integrasi; Tower Bersama
- Website: http://www.tower-bersama.com

Tower Bersama Group (TBG) is a telecommunication tower providers in Indonesia.

== History ==
Since 2003 with the establishment of PT United Towerindo, TBG has been providing coverage solutions and continually expanding its infrastructure portfolio through build-to-suit developments and acquisition of existing tower portfolios and tower companies.

The companies making up the Tower Bersama Group include PT Tower Bersama, PT United Towerindo, PT Telenet Internusa, PT Batavia Towerindo, PT Bali Telekom, PT Prima Media Selaras, and PT Triaka Bersama. These companies operate under the unified management of Tower Bersama Group.

== Mergers and acquisitions ==
Below are the companies that making up the TBG :
1. PT. United Towerindo
2. PT. Telenet Internusa
3. PT. Tower Bersama
4. PT. Triaka Bersama
5. PT. Batavia Towerindo
6. PT. Bali Telekom
7. PT. Prima Media Selaras
8. PT. Solu Sindo Kreasi Pratama (Indonesian Tower)
9. PT. Mitrayasa Sarana Informasi (Infratel)
10. PT. Towerindo Konvergensi
11. PT. Metric Solusi Integrasi
12. PT. Tower One

On August 9, 2011 TBG acquire 100% stake in PT. Mitarayasa Sarana Informasi worth Rp 200 billion.
