= UFO sightings in Indonesia =

List of alleged UFO sightings within Indonesia

This is a list of alleged sightings of unidentified flying objects or UFOs in Indonesia.

== 1940s ==
- In 1942, Allied pilots reported anomalous flying objects over Sumatra.

== 1950s ==
- On 21 February 1953, a flying saucer was allegedly sighted flying at high speed over Malang, East Java.
- On 23 February 1953, an oval-shaped object emitting a slate-green glow was reported flying over Gorontalo, North Sulawesi. It was rapidly moving southbound.
- In July 1959, a group of humanoids was spotted in Alor and Pantar, East Nusa Tenggara. They were described as 1.8 metres (5.9 ft) tall, having a ruddy complexion, and possessing wavy white hair. Witnesses were under the impression the humanoids were searching for something. The villagers attempted to assault them with arrows, but the beings were purportedly impervious to weapons. One witness claimed to have been paralyzed, and one child was allegedly abducted. No craft was reported.

== 1960s ==
- Over the course of a week in 1964, numerous unidentified objects were spotted over Surabaya, East Java. There were also reports of positive radar returns. The military allegedly fired artillery at the unknown objects, although the efforts were purportedly futile. It was claimed that at least one object had landed.

== 1970s ==
- On 17 August 1973, a tourist claimed to have accidentally captured a photo of a saucer-like object over Mount Agung, Bali.
- On 22 September 1975, a man inspecting the construction of an oil rig off Cilamaya, West Java, captured a photo of a disclike object over a tanker.
- On 27 June 1977, an unidentified object was witnessed moving through the sky and then turning south over Porong, East Java. It emitted a yellow glow from behind and left a trail in its wake. Notably, it was photographed three times by the witnesses.
- On 7 October 1977, nine witnesses in Jakarta observed a single disclike object in the sky.
- On 11 November 1977, an unknown object was observed both by witnesses and on radar.

== 1980s ==
- The week before Ramadan in either 1984 or 1985, two witnesses observed a trio of vertically-oriented orbs near a palm tree in Tarakan, East Kalimantan, which quickly disappeared.

== 1990s ==
- In 1994, a white, silent, low-flying object was seen in Probolinggo, East Java.
- In July 1995, an egg-shaped object resembling a hot air balloon was allegedly observed between Magelang and Salatiga, Central Java, which then purportedly vanished.
- In September 1997, a craft that looked like a B-2 bomber, but white, was sighted over Salatiga, Central Java.
- On 16 April 1998, an ovoid object that tapered to a point at the rear was seen flying near Mount Salak, West Java.

== 2000s ==
- On 3 February 2000, a businessman from Germany witnessed a spinning spheroid over Denpasar, Bali. It stopped, shone a beam downward at the city, and then departed.
- On 12 October 2003, an unidentified object appeared to cloak itself over Salatiga, Central Java. It was photographed before it disappeared.
- On 5 May 2007, a stationary object was seen in the sky over Pekanbaru, Riau. Resembling a glowing saucer, it vanished after about 20 minutes. Digital footage was recorded of the event.
- In October 2009, a US Marine providing aid following an earthquake in Padang, West Sumatra, witnessed a rotating, octagonal flying object. He also noted a pyramidal shape on the upper portion. He claimed that he was shortly thereafter intimidated by an unknown unit of American soldiers, apparently in response to his attempting to approach the craft.

== 2010s ==
- On 23 January 2011, a crop circle was reported in Yogyakarta. Though there was some debate as to whether or not it was too complex to have been hoaxed in a single night, Nur Agustinus, who headed BETA UFO in Surabaya, was neither convinced of a hoax nor a nonterrestrial provenance. He speculated that it may have been caused by an unknown phenomenon related to sound frequency and heat.

== See also ==
- List of reported UFO sightings
- UFO sightings in Australia
