= Traditions of Indonesia =

Cultural values and customs of Indonesia

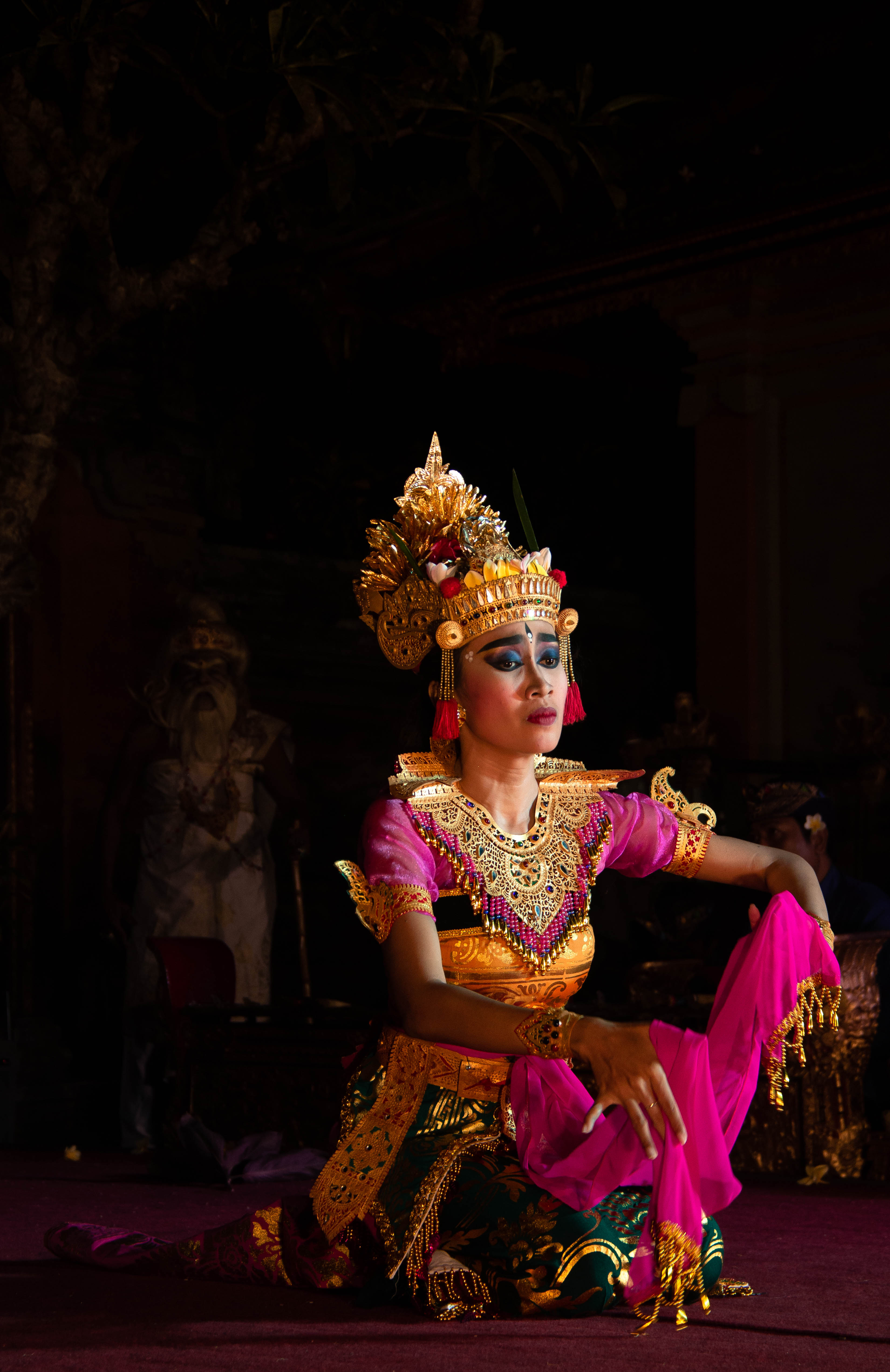
A Balinese dancer in a traditional costume and elaborate gold headdress performing a traditional Balinese Legong dance routine

The traditions of Indonesia encompass a variety of cultural beliefs, values, and customs passed down through multiple generations over several centuries. Indonesia is a vast country of sprawling archipelago with a diverse demographic range of over 600 ethnic groups, and speaking more than 700 living languages.

With 202.9 million Muslims (88% of the total population as of 2009), Indonesia also has significant numbers of Christians. Protestant and Catholics population are the majority, with other Christian groups existing as well. The majority of Hindu demographics in Indonesia live in the island of Bali. Buddhist Indonesian are located throughout the country, and are ethnically identified as Chinese Indonesians.

== Etiquette ==
In Indonesia, etiquette – methods of showing respect (Indonesian: hormat) – has been considered as one of the key factors in social interactions. Etiquette varies greatly depending on one's status relative to the person being interacted with. Some key points of Indonesian etiquette include:

- Hierarchical relationships are respected, emphasised and maintained,
- Respect is usually shown to those with status, power, position, and age
- Elders must be respected by doing a salim or gently touching the head of people elder to you
- Direct contradiction may be avoided.
- Saving one's face means one should consider others' dignity and avoid them to experience shame or humiliation.
- Openly correcting or pointing one's mistake would cause someone to felt ashamed, and humiliating someone is considered socially intolerable and impolite.
- Saying terima kasih ("thank you") after receiving services or favours demonstrates one's good manner.
- When greeting or introducing oneself, smiling, handshake (salam) and a slight nod is a good gesture, gently touch the counterpart's extended hands, before finally bringing one's hands back to the chest to demonstrate that you welcome from the heart. The greeted party will then reciprocate this gesture.
- If it is not possible to handshake your counterparts, for example addressing larger crowds with a distance between you, making a greeting gesture by putting your hand together in front of your chest while slightly bowing. It is similar to Añjali Mudrā.
- Some conservative Indonesian Muslims might avoid direct touch with opposite sex including handshake, so performing non-touching salam (anjali) is recommended when greeting opposite sex that are conservative Muslims.
- It is traditionally preferred to use the right hand when shaking hands, offering a gift, handing or receiving something, eating, pointing or generally making physical contact with someone else.
- Do not touch the head of an adult, as it is commonly believed that the soul inhabits the head, and the head is therefore sacred.
- One should avoid putting their chin upward, putting their hands on their hips or pointing when talking to other people.
- Pointing toward someone with index fingers are considered rude, pointing with thumbs are considered more polite.
- It is recommended traditionally to speak softly but clear with a somewhat subdued tone, as speaking too loud is socially discouraged.
- Conservative and modest dress sense should be adopted — especially by women.
- When visiting a place of worship, the proper dress etiquette for such places is of utmost importance.
- When entering a mosque, always remove your shoes.
- Bathing suit and swimwear are only suitable to wear in and around beaches and swimming pools.
- Women swimwear and bikini are best covered from hips with sarong when coming out from water.
- To announce your presence, ring a bell or knock at the door while saying assalamu 'alaikum if the host is Muslim, or more common permisi.
- Guests generally wait to be allowed to enter the house and to sit in the guest room. They may also wait to be offered a drink, finishing the whole cup may imply that the guest wished the drink to be refilled.
- Guest are generally expected to not overstay their welcome, as the host may avoid explicitly indicating that the guests should leave since it is socially discouraged. It is up to the guest to estimate the length of their visit and initiate the farewell.
- Food is often taken from a shared dish in the middle. In banquet seated dinner party, you will be served the food and it would not be considered rude if you helped yourself after that. Wait to be invited to eat before you start.
- It is better to sit down while eating, yet in some circumstances eating while standing is acceptable.
- Depending on the situation some people may use their hands to eat. Eat or pass food with your right hand only.
- Making sounds while eating is considered not polite, try not make a sound when slurping or the sound of spoon touching the dish.
- Excessively mixing or manipulating the serving of food may be regarded as impolite and childish.
- Offer gifts with the right hand only, or better yet with both hands. Gifts are also not opened immediately when received.

== Social gathering ==
=== Arisan ===
Generally the arisan is a social gathering that involves Rotating Savings and Credit Association. It takes place at a fixed interval, usually once a month, however being an informal social network this may vary. It takes place at each member's home in turn. Each member should chip in the same amount of money and then the lot is drawn. The member that wins, receives payment of the collected money and will organize place and food, for the next gathering. In the course of the arisan the amount paid to other members will equal the amount received when the arisan is held. There is also a saying' eat or not eat as long as we have each other'

=== Selametan ===
Selametan is a communal feast from Java, representing the social unity of those participating in it. It is practised by Javanese, Sundanese, and Madurese ethnic groups. It can be understood as a kind of thanksgiving ritual, but many consider that by being involved, the individual also seeks blessings and protections from Gods. Selamet in Javanese means safe from any harm, and can also means successful, relieved from any troubles or obstacles. The selametan is usually held at life cycle events such as birth, circumcision, engagement, marriage, and death. Or life events such as moving residence, departing for a long trip (such as hajj pilgrimage or working abroad), opening a new business (such as opening warung), career promotion.

Javanese believe selametan could be performed as tolak bala, a ritual to deter negative elements or unfortunate events that might take place in the future. Selametan also might be held in accordance with religious events, such as Mawlid or Satu Suro. During selametan, cone shaped rice portions called tumpeng are usually served.

=== Harvest Festival ===
In Indonesia there are many kinds of festive ceremonies and rituals that linked to agricultural activities, from plant the seeds to harvest. One of them is Seren Taun, an annual traditional Sundanese rice harvest festival and ceremony. This festivals originally held to mark the new agriculture year in Sundanese ancient calendar as well as thanks giving for the blessings of the abundance rice harvest, and also to pray for the next successful harvest. Other ethnics such as Javanese might held slametan ceremonies for starting agricultural calendar to harvesting. While Dayak people performing Hudoq dances during harvest thanksgiving festival. Hudoq is deity that symbolize pest, and by appeasing Hudoq is believed will deter the pest in coming agricultural cycle.
