= Speed limits in Indonesia =

Indonesia employs a maximum and minimum speed limit, even though it is more like recommendation rather than a rule.

The general speed limits are as follows:

- In highways is 60–80 km/h (37–50 mph) for inner city highway and 60–100 km/h (37–62 mph) for outer city highway.
- In intercity roads is 40–80 km/h (25–50 mph)).
- In metropolitan area, the maximum speed is 50 km/h (31 mph).
- In countryside and settlements area, the maximum speed is 30 km/h (19 mph).

Since April 2022, speed cameras are used to enforce speed limits on toll roads in Indonesia. Speeding violations are penalized with an electronic ticket. These speed cameras also monitor for vehicle capacity violations.
