= Aquaculture in Indonesia =

Indonesia ranks as the fourth most productive country in the world measured in terms of gross yearly aquaculture production with an estimated 14.4 million tons in 2014. It benefits from being an archipelago nation with an extensive coastline over 81,000 km long, situated in a tropical climate. The top aquaculture products exported include shrimp, fish and seaweed.

Aquaculture in Indonesia has seen a tremendous growth in its contribution to fish supply in Indonesia, increasing from 10.6% in 1960 to 40.2% in 2014, and looks to surpass the output of capture fisheries by 2026 under business as usual scenarios.

Indonesia produced 490,000 tons of shrimp in 2004, which was 8% of the world production for the year. In 1999, 507,513 ha of Indonesia was occupied by aquaculture, 60% of which being brackish water ponds, 28% being integrated rice-fish farming, and 12% being freshwater ponds.

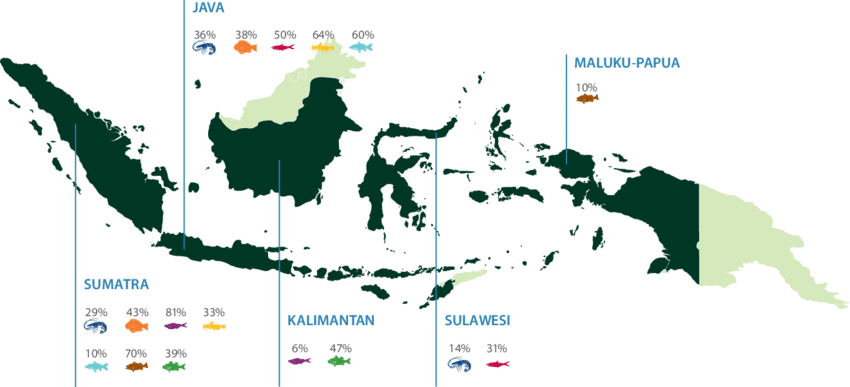
Indonesia aquaculture regions with percentages of national production

== History ==
Since the Ministry of Marine Affairs and Fisheries (MMAF) was created in 2000, there has been a strong push for aquaculture development by the Indonesian government with the creation of development zones, investment in private hatcheries, distribution and marketing channels for fish and fingerlings, training, improved information systems and support for product certification and access to capital.

== Locations ==
Inland waters include rivers, lakes, swamps, reservoirs or dams, fields and ponds. Aquaculture can be divided into two types namely brackish water fisheries and freshwater fisheries. Indonesian brackish water fisheries in the north coast of Java do a lot, the east coast of Aceh, Riau, North Sumatra and South Sumatra.

== Species ==
Eight species accounted for roughly 90% of Indonesia's aquaculture production in 2014: Nile tilapia, clarias catfish, milkfish, white-leg shrimp, common carp, pangasius catfish and asian tiger shrimp

== Challenges ==
There are a number of social and environmental challenges, including loss of mangrove and wetland ecosystems, pollution of waterways, rendering of edible fish into fish meal and oils for aquaculture diets, marginalized local farmers, increased social tensions and fish disease outbreaks.
