= List of Indonesian endemic animals =

This article contains the list of Indonesian animals.

== List ==
Species name	Family	Region	Vernacular name	Status
Aethopyga duyvenbodei	Nectariniidae	Sangihe island	Elegant sunbird	EN
Gracula robusta	Sturnidae	North Sumatra	Nias hill myna	CR
Ailurops ursinus	Phalangeridae	Sulawesi	Sulawesi bear cuscus	
Axis kuhlii	Cervidae	East Java	Bawean deer	
Babyrousa babyrussa	Suidae	Sulawesi	Buru babirusa	
Barbourula kalimantanensis	Bombinatoridae	Borneo	Bornean flat-headed frog	EN
Bubalus depressicornis	Bovidae	Sulawesi	Low-land anoa	
Bubalus quarlesi	Bovidae	Sulawesi	Mountain anoa	
Callosciurus adamsi	Sciuridae	Borneo		
Capricornis sumatraensis sumatraensis	Bovidae	Sumatra		
Casuarius bennetti	Casuariidae	Papua	Dwarf cassowary	
Casuarius unappendiculatus	Casuariidae	Papua		
Catopuma badia	Felidae	Borneo	Bay cat	
Cervus timorensis	Cervidae	Bali, Java island, Timor	Javan deer	
Chelodina mccordi	Chelidae	Nusa Tenggara Timur	Roti Island snake-necked turtle	
Chelonia mydas	Cheloniidae	Java island	Green turtle	
Crocodylus raninus	Crocodylidae	Borneo		
Dendrolagus pulcherrimus	Macropodidae	Papua	Golden-mantled tree-kangaroo	
Dermochelys coriacea	Cheloniidae	Java island		
Dicerorhinus sumatrensis	Rhinocerotidae	Sumatra	Sumatran rhinoceros	
Eos cyanogenia	Psittacidae	Papua	Black-winged lory	
Eretmochelys imbricata	Cheloniidae	Java island	Hawksbill sea turtle	
Hemiscyllium freycineti	Hemiscylliidae	Papua	Indonesian speckled carpetshark	
Hylobates moloch	Hylobatidae	Java island	Silvery gibbon	
Hylobates muelleri	Hylobatidae	Borneo	Müller's Bornean gibbon	
Hystrix javanica	Hystricidae	Java island	Sunda porcupine	
Hystrix sumatrae	Hystricidae	Java island		
Lanthanotus borneensis	Scincidae	Borneo	Earless monitor	
Lariscus hosei	Sciuridae	Borneo		
Lepidochelys olivacea	Cheloniidae	Java island		
Leptophryne cruentata	Bufonidae	West Java	Bleeding toad	
Leucopsar rothschildi	Sturnidae	Bali		
Macaca nigra	Cercopithecidae	North Sulawesi	Celebes crested macaque	
Macaca pagensis	Cercopithecidae	Mentawai		
Macrocephalon maleo	Megapodiidae	Central Sulawesi	Maleo	
Macrogalidia musschenbroekii	Viverridae	Sulawesi	Sulawesi palm civet	
Naja sputatrix	Elapidae		Indonesian spitting cobra	
Naja sumatrana	Elapidae	Sumatra	Sumatran spitting cobra	
Nesolagus netscheri	Leporidae	Sumatra	Sumatran striped rabbit	
Nisaetus floris	Accipitridae	Lesser Sundas	Flores hawk-eagle	CR
Orcaella brevirostris	Delphinidae	East Borneo	Irrawaddy dolphin	
Otus manadensis siaoensis	Strigidae	Siau Island	Siau scops owl	CR
Panthera pardus	Felidae	Java island	java leopard	
Panthera tigris sumatrae	Felidae	Sumatra	Sumatra tiger	
Paradisaea rubra	Paradisaeidae	Papua	Bird of Paradise	
Phalanger alexandrae	Phalangeridae	North Maluku	Gebe cuscus	
Phalanger matabiru	Phalangeridae	Maluku		
Phalanger rothschildi	Phalangeridae	Maluku		
Philautus jacobsoni	Phalangeridae	Central Java		
Pongo abelli	Hominidae	Sumatra	Sumatran orangutan	
Pongo pygmaeus	Hominidae	Borneo	Bornean orangutan	
Pongo tapanuliensis	Hominidae	Sumatra	Tapanuli orangutan	
Presbytis comata	Cercopithecidae	Java island	Javan surili	
Presbytis frontata	Cercopithecidae	Borneo		
Presbytis rubicunda	Cercopithecidae	Borneo		
Prionailurus bengalensis	Felidae	Java island		
Rhinoceros sondaicus	Rhinocerotidae	West Java		
Scleropages formosus	Osteoglossidae	Sumatra	Asian arowana	
Simias concolor	Cercopithecidae	Mentawai	Pig-tailed langur	
Strigocuscus celebensis	Phalangeridae	Sulawesi	Sulawesi dwarf cuscus	
Sundasciurus juvencus	Sciuridae	Sumatra, Bali		
Taphozous achates	Emballonuridae	Bali	Tomb bat	
Tarsius bancanus	Tarsiidae	Sumatra, Borneo	Bangka tarsius	
Tarsius pelengensis	Tarsiidae	Sulawesi	Peleng tarsius	
Tarsius pumilus	Tarsiidae	Sulawesi	Pygmy tarsius	
Tarsius sangirensis	Tarsiidae	North Sulawesi	Sangir tarsius	
Tarsius tarsier	Tarsiidae	North Sulawesi	Sulawesi tarsius	
Trachypithecus auratus	Cercopithecidae	Java island	Javan lutung	
Tragulus javanicus	Tragulidae	Java island	Java Mouse-deer	
Tupaia chrysogaster	Tupaiidae	Mentawai	Golden-bellied treeshrew	
Varanus komodoensis	Varanidae	Nusa Tenggara	Komodo dragon	
Sturnus melanopterus	sturnidae	Java	Black-winged myna	
Sturnus tricolor	Sturnidae	Java	Grey-backed myna	
Sturnus tertius	Sturnidae	Bali	Grey-rumped myna	
Aethopyga mystacalis	Nectarinidae	Java	Javan sunbird	
Aethopyga eximia	Nectarinidae	Java	White-flanked sunbird	
Psaltria exilis	Aegithalidae	Java	Pygmy bushtit	
Halcyon cyanoventris	Alcedinidae	Java	Javan kingfisher	
Alcedo coerulescens	Alcedinidae	Java, Nusa Tenggara, Sumatera	Cerulean Kingfisher	
Species name	Family	Region	Vernacular name	Status

== See also ==
- Fauna of Indonesia
- Endemic birds of Indonesia
- List of Indonesian birds
