= Academic grading in Syria =

In Syria the academic grading system functions with points out of 100, the minimum grade required to pass an undergraduate class is 60.

Percent	Qualification
95–100	Honor (Sharaf) (Arabic: الشرف)
85–94	Excellent (Imtiyaz) (Arabic: امتياز)
75–84	Very good (Jayed Jeddan) (Arabic: جيد جداً)
65–74	Good (Jayed ) (Arabic: جيد)
60–65	Acceptable (Maqboul) (Arabic: مقبول)
0–59	Failed (Raseb) (Arabic: راسب)
