= International rankings of Indonesia =

The following are international rankings of Indonesia.

== General ==
- Indonesia ranked 70 out of 174, Good Country Index (2024).
- Indonesia hosts 10 UNESCO's World Heritage Sites and holds 12 items UNESCO's Intangible Cultural Heritage.
- Freedom in the World: partly free (2025).

== Agriculture ==
See List of largest producing countries of agricultural commodities for details on each commodity.

Largest producer of

- cinnamon (2020).
- cloves (2020).
- coconuts (2020).
- nutmeg, mace, cardamoms (2020)
- vanilla (2013)

Second largest producer of

- bananas (2020)
- non-chicken eggs (2020)
- green beans (2020)
- mango, mangosteen, guava (2020)

Third largest producer of

- black pepper (2020)
- chili pepper (2020)
- cocoa (2020)
- rice (2013)

Fourth largest producer of

- abaca (2020)
- coffee (2020)
- chicken eggs (2020)
- pineapples (2020)
- tobacco(2020)

Fifth largest producer of

- avocados (2020)
- eggplants (2020)
- ginger (2020)
- papaya (2020)

== Cities ==
- Jakarta ranks 1st among cities proper by population (2025).
- Jakarta: Alpha-rank Global city (2012).
- Jakarta ranked 51 out of 84 (Global Cities Index, 2014).
- Jakarta ranked 81 out of 120 (Global City Competitiveness Index, 2012).
- Pekalongan listed as UNESCO Cities of Crafts and Folk Art (2014).
- Surabaya: Sufficiency-rank Global city (2012).
- Surabaya ranked 110 out of 120 (Global City Competitiveness Index, 2012).

== Demographics ==
- Social Progress Index: ranked 80 of 170 (2023).
- Composite Index of National Capability: ranked 14 (score: 0.013708) (2007).
- Christianity by country: ranked 25 in total Christian population (25 million - 10% of the population).
- Ethnic diversity rank: 24 out of 159 countries (2003).
- Foundation of well-being: ranked 67 (2015).
- Index of Globalization 2010, ranked 86 out of 181 countries.
- Hinduism by country: ranked 4 in total Hindu population.
- Hinduism by country: ranked 24 by the percentage of population.
- International Innovation Index: 55 out of 139 (2025).
- Islam by country: ranked 1 in total Muslim population.
- Islam by country: ranked 35 by the percentage of population.
- Life expectancy estimated by CIA World Factbook, ranked 149 out of 227 (2022).
- Linguistic diversity index of Indonesia: 0.816 (2017).
- Population of Indonesia ranked 4 out of 228 countries and territories (2022).
- Population density: 87 out of 248 (2021).
- Social Progress Index: ranked 86 (2015).

== Economic ==
- Bribe Payers Index: 25 out of 28 main exporting countries.
- Current account balance deficit: ranked 7 (2019).
- Ease of doing business index: 73 out of 190 (2020).
- Exports: 30 out of 205 (2022).
- Global Corruption Barometer: 65 out of (collectively) 95 (2013).
- Global Services Location Index (2009): 5 out of 50 countries.
- Index of Economic Freedom: 63 out of 177 (2022).
- International Property Rights Index: 67 out of 129 countries (2022).
- Nominal GDP ranked 16 by IMF (2022); ranked 16 by World Bank (2021); ranked 16 by United Nations (2020).
- Nominal GDP per capita ranked 113 by IMF (2022); ranked 113 by World Bank (2021); ranked 114 by United Nations (2020).
- World Competitiveness Yearbook: 44 out of 63 (2022).
- United Nations: Human Development Index (HDI): 114 out of 191 countries (2022).

== Education ==
- Education Index scored 0.65 (2019)
- Literacy rate: 96.0% (2020).
- EF English Proficiency Index: 81 out of 111 countries - low proficiency (2022).

== Environment ==
- Natural disaster risk: 136 out of 171 (2016).
- Yale University Center for Environmental Law and Policy and Columbia University Center for International Earth Science Information Network: Environmental Performance Index, ranked 137 out of 180 countries (2024).

== Geography ==
- Total area Indonesia is the 15th largest out of 249 territories.
- Largest archipelagic state in the world by area and population
- Largest island country in the world: 17,508 islands
- Java Island is the most populated island in the world, 148,7 million people (2021).

== Military ==
- Center for Strategic and International Studies: active troops ranked 17 out of 180 countries.
- Global Militarization Index: 98 out of 151 countries (2013).
- Number of warships: ranked 14 out 55 listed countries.
- UN peacekeepers: ranked 16 out of 128 countries (2014).
- World's largest arms importers: ranked 5 (2013).

== Political ==
- Transparency International: Corruption Perceptions Index, ranked 99 out of 180 countries (2024).
- Reporters without borders: Worldwide press freedom index, ranked 146 of 179 territories.
- The Economist Democracy Index: 59 out of 167 countries (2024).
- Global Peace Index: 48 out of 163 countries (2024).
- Global Terrorism Index: 31 out of 124 (score: 3,993) (2024).

== Society ==
- World Economic Forum: Global Gender Gap Report 2022 scored 0.697
- World Health Organization: suicide rate, ranked 171 out of 178 (2019).
- University of Leicester Satisfaction with Life Index 2006, ranked 69 out of 178 countries
- World Giving Index: ranked 1 out of 157 countries- very generous (2021).
- World Happiness Report: ranked 87 out of 146 countries (2022).
- Happy Planet Index: 14 out of 111 countries (2012).

== Sport ==
- FIFA World Rankings: Men's team ranked highest was 76th in September 1998.
- FIFA World Rankings: Women's team ranked highest was 58th in October 2003.

== Technology ==
- Fixed-broadband subscriptions, ranked 25 out of 166. (2017)
- Mobile-cellular subscriptions, ranked 3 out of 172. (2017)
- Number of mobile phones in use ranked 3 out of 79 (2016).
- Economist Intelligence Unit: E-readiness 2008, ranked 68 out of 70 countries
- World Economic Forum: Global Information Technology Report (GITR) 2011: ranked 53 out of 138 countries.
- World Intellectual Property Organization: Global Innovation Index 2026, ranked 55 out of 139 countries

== Tourism ==
- World Tourism Organization: World Tourism rankings 2007, ranked 37 out of 200 Countries.
- International arrival of foreign tourists to Indonesia ranked 10 in the Asia and the Pacific (2019).

== See also ==
- Lists of countries
- Lists by country
- List of international rankings
