= .id =

Internet country-code top level domain for Indonesia

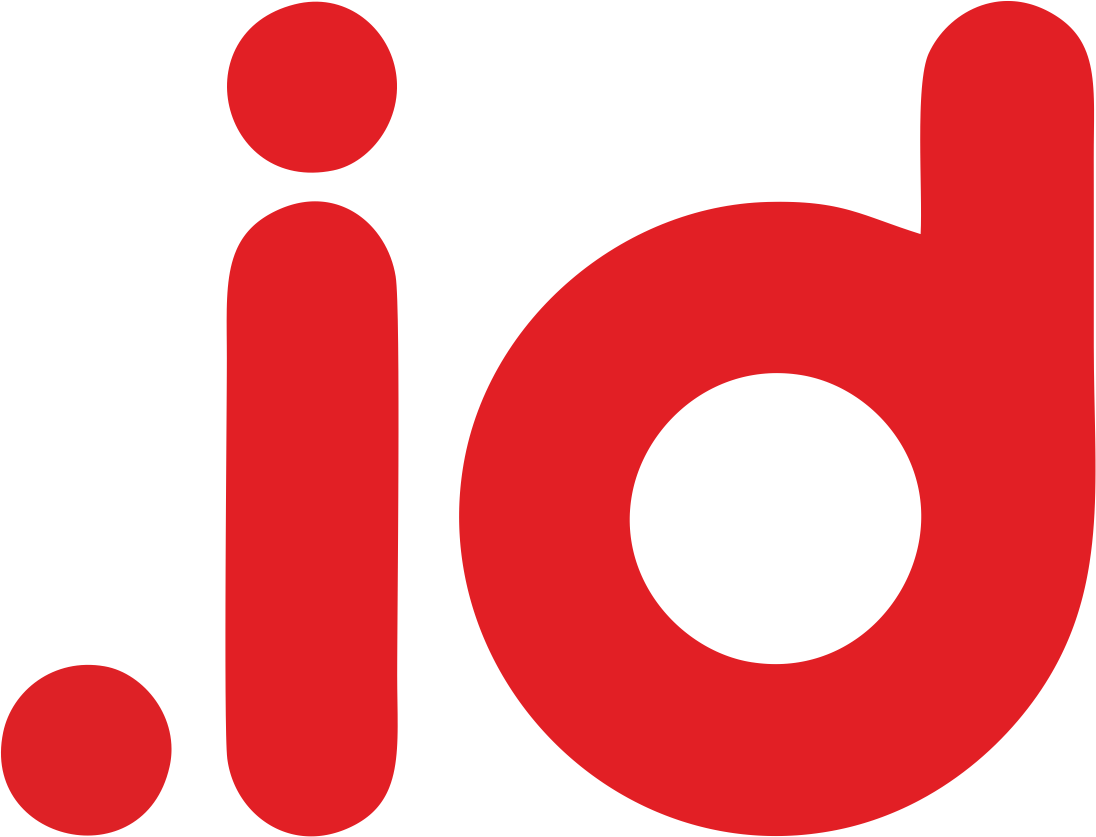
- Official logo
- Introduced: 27 February 1993; 33 years ago
- TLD type: Country code top-level domain
- Status: Active
- Registry: Indonesian Internet Domain Name Administrator
- Sponsor: Indonesian Internet Domain Name Administrator
- Intended use: Entities connected with Indonesia
- Actual use: Very popular in Indonesia
- Registered domains: 819,465 (2023-11-30)
- Registration restrictions: Indonesian presence is no longer required for second-level .id registrations; registrant requirements still apply to third-level registrations under restricted second-level domains, such as .co.id, which requires the registrant to be an Indonesian corporation, or trademark owner, with a physical presence in the country.
- Structure: Registrations are made at the second level, or at the third level beneath various second-level labels
- Dispute policies: Regulation
- DNSSEC: Yes
- Registry website: pandi.id/en

.id is the Internet country code top-level domain (ccTLD) for Indonesia. It was first registered in February 1993. Since 2007, it is managed by the Indonesian Internet Domain Name Administrator (Indonesian: Pengelola Nama Domain Internet Indonesia or PANDI), based on regulation set by Decree of Minister of Communication and Information Technology (now Ministry of Communication and Digital Affairs).

== Second-level domains ==
On 11 March 2013, PANDI approved the adoption of a new desa second level domain for Indonesia's 72,944 villages with autonomy for local affairs.

As of 17 August 2014, second-level domain registrations have entered general availability, allowing registrations to be made directly under .id, without a prefix. This brings the total of available extensions to 13:

- .id – General use
- ac.id — Higher education institutions
- biz.id — Small and medium enterprises
- co.id — Commercial and business entities
- desa.id — Villages
- go.id — Government and governmental system(s)
- mil.id — Military
- my.id — Personal use
- net.id — Communication/ISP companies
- or.id — Formal organizations/Community
- sch.id — Schools
- web.id — Informal organizations/Personal
- ponpes.id – Religious/Islamic boarding schools
