= Flora of Indonesia =

Plants of Indonesia

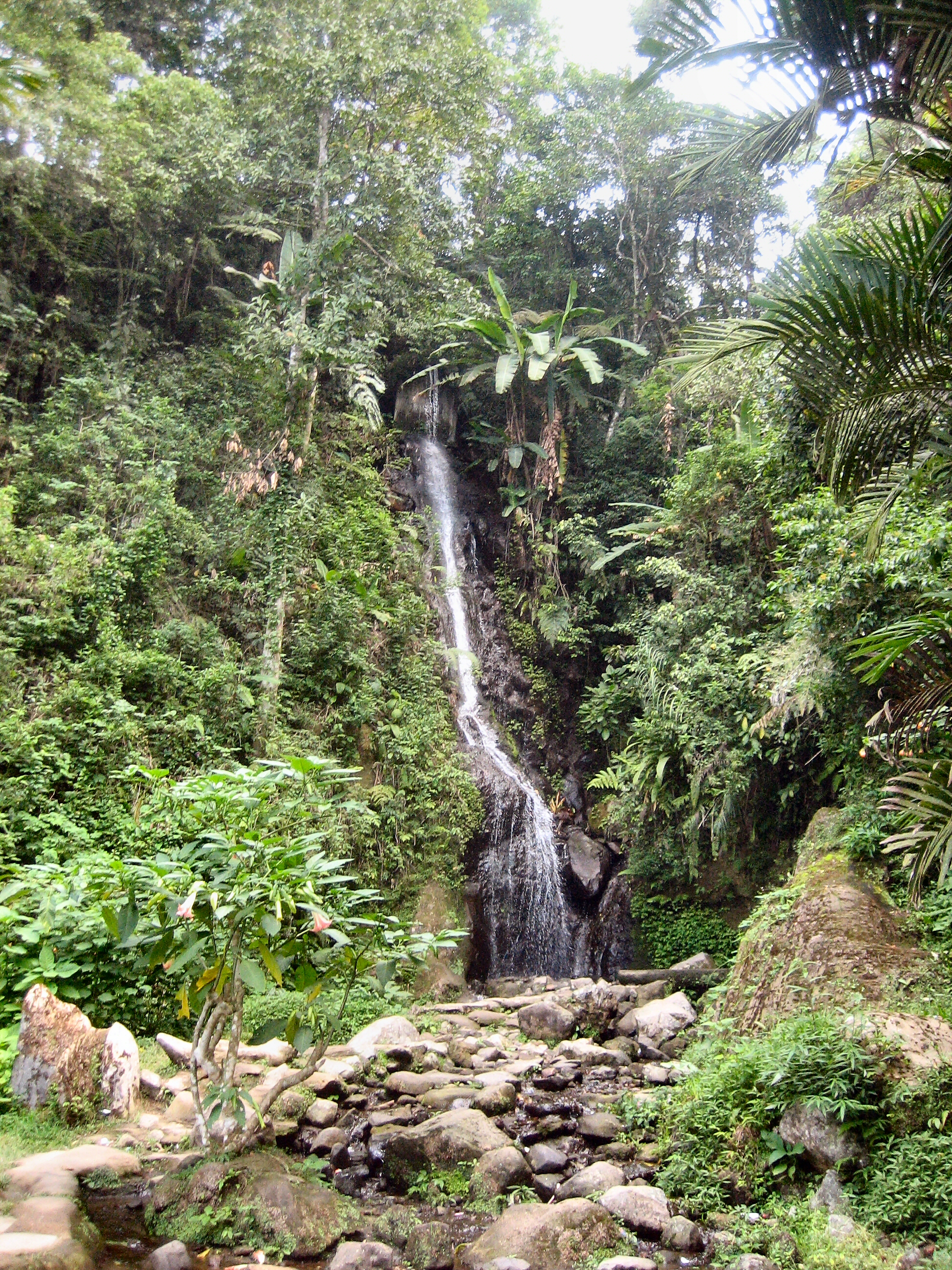
A melting pot of Indonesian flora in Cibodas botanical garden, Indonesia.

The flora consists of many unique varieties of tropical plants. Blessed with a tropical climate and roughly 17,000 islands, Indonesia is the nation with the second highest biodiversity in the world. The flora of Indonesia reflects an intermingling of Asian, Australian and unique, Indonesian lineages. This is due to the geography of Indonesia, located between the aforementioned continents. The archipelago consists of a variety of regions, from the tropical rain forests of the northern lowlands and the seasonal forests of the southern lowlands through the hill and mountain vegetation, to subalpine shrub vegetation. With the second longest coastline in the world, Indonesia also has many swamps and other varieties of coastal vegetation. Combined, these all give rise to a huge floral biodiversity.

There are about 24,100 species of vascular plants documented in Indonesia. This consists of 21,721 vascular plants, 2,314 ferns and fern allies, and 85 gymnosperms. The largest plant families include orchids with 3.798 species, coffee with 1,580 species, grasses with 642 species, laurels with 606 species, palms with 582 species, myrtle with 570 species, legumes with 560 species, heather plants with 538 species, aroids with 505 species, and melastomes with 495 species. Indonesia is also home to some unusual species of carnivorous plants. One exceptional species is known as Rafflesia arnoldi, named after Sir Thomas Stamford Raffles and Dr. Thomas Arnold, who discovered the flower in the depths of Bengkulu, southwest Sumatra. This parasitic plant has the largest flower of any plant, does not produce leaves and grows only on one species of liana on the rainforest floor. Another unusual plant is Amorphophallus titanum from Sumatra. Numerous species of insect trapping pitcher plants (Nepenthes spp.) can also be found in Borneo, Sumatra, and other islands of the Indonesian archipelago. There are a staggering 6000 traditional medicinal plants used as Jamu.

== Origins of Indonesian flora ==
The origin of flora in Indonesia is a result of geographical and geological events involving the Asian and Australasian continents. The present island of New Guinea was connected with the Australian continent, forming a supercontinent called Gondwana. This supercontinent began to break up 140 million years ago, and the New Guinea region moved towards the equator. As a result, animals from New Guinea travelled to the Australian continent and vice versa, resulting in large amounts of speciation in the many new ecosystems. This exchange continued to occur until the two landmasses separated completely.

Asian lineages in Indonesia are the result of the reformation of the Laurasia supercontinent, which existed after the break-up of Rodinia around 1 billion years ago. Around 200 million years ago, the Laurasian supercontinent split completely, forming the continents of Laurentia (now the Americas) and Eurasia. Despite this separation, the mainland of the Eurasian continent was not separated completely from the Indonesian archipelago. As a result, organisms from the Eurasian mainland could colonize the archipelago; and, under different environmental pressures, new species diverged.

In the nineteenth century, Alfred Russel Wallace proposed the idea of the Wallace Line, which is a line that divides Indonesian archipelago into two regions, the Asian biogeographical region (Sundaland) and the Australasian biogeographical Region (Wallacea). The line runs through the Indonesian Archipelago, between Borneo and Sulawesi (Celebes); and between Bali and Lombok.

The Indonesian archipelago, home of the Spice Islands, has been known since ancient times as a source of spices, such as cloves, nutmeg, and black pepper. The Maluku Islands were, until the late eighteenth century, the only source of many economically significant spices. In the colonial era, cloves and nutmeg were the most valuable commodities behind gold and silver for European colonists. During the colonial era in Indonesia, the Dutch also created many plantations of coffee, tea and sugar cane, mostly in Java.

During the history of Indonesia, many foreign plants from India, China, and Europe have been introduced to the archipelago. Plant species such as tea, coffee and rubber tree have become established.

== Vegetation types ==
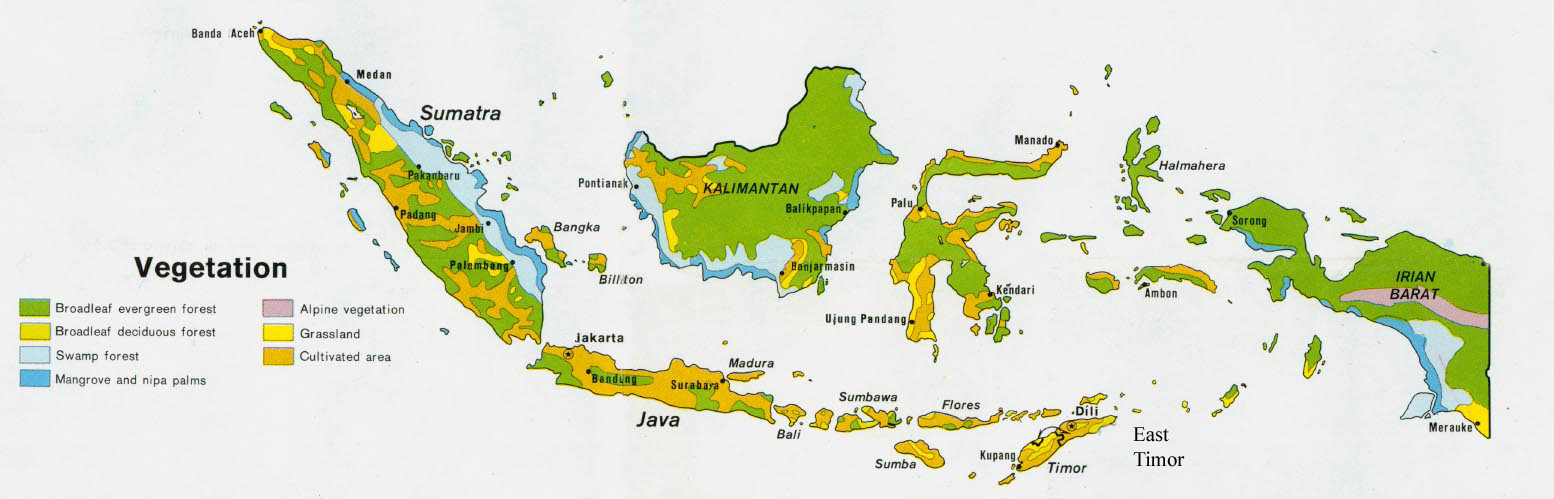
The Distribution of Indonesian vegetation

Indonesia's terrestrial flora can be divided into several vegetation groups. The most important factor is rainfall, followed by temperature, which both affect water availability. The distribution of Indonesian flora is dominated by broadleaf evergreen forests. This is mostly seen in the regions where population density is still relatively low, such as Sumatra, Borneo, Sulawesi, and West Papua. On Java and Bali, the vegetation is dominated by cultivated plants. Swamp forests, mangrove, and Nypa fruticans forests are found along the coast. In the mountainous regions, subalpine and alpine vegetation is dominant. In the lesser Sunda islands, where rainfall is not as plentiful as in other parts of Indonesia, grasslands are regularly seen.

== Biodiversity ==
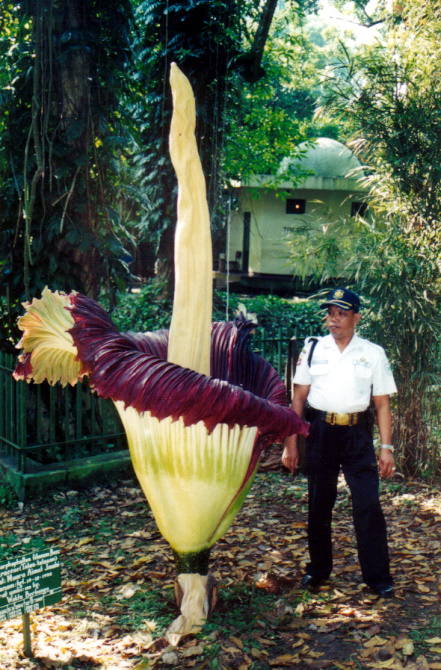
The flower of Amorphophallus titanum at Bogor Botanical Gardens

According to the Conservation International, there are two biodiversity regions in Indonesia: Wallacea and Sundaland. The provinces of West Papua and Papua are also extremely biodiverse. Lorentz National Park, located in the province of Papua, was declared a World Heritage Site in 1999 by UNESCO.

=== Sundaland ===
Sundaland, which is located on the west part of the Indonesian archipelago, holds about 25,000 different species of plants. 15,000 of them are endemic to this region. Scyphostegiaceae is a plant family represented by a single species, Scyphostegia borneensis, which is endemic to Borneo. Another 155 species of Dipterocarpus are endemic to this island. Borneo also has more than 2,000 species of orchids. The forests in Sumatra include more than 100 species of Dipterocarpus, nearly a dozen of them are endemic to this island. The island of Java has about 270 endemic orchid species. It is home to Alsomitra macrocarpa which has gliding seeds.

At least 117 plant genera are endemic to this biodiversity hotspot. 59 of them are found in Borneo and 17 in Sumatra. Unique plants from this region are similar to ones from the Asian continent, examples include Rafflesia arnoldii, pitcher plants and Javanese edelweiss (Anaphalis javanica) as examples.

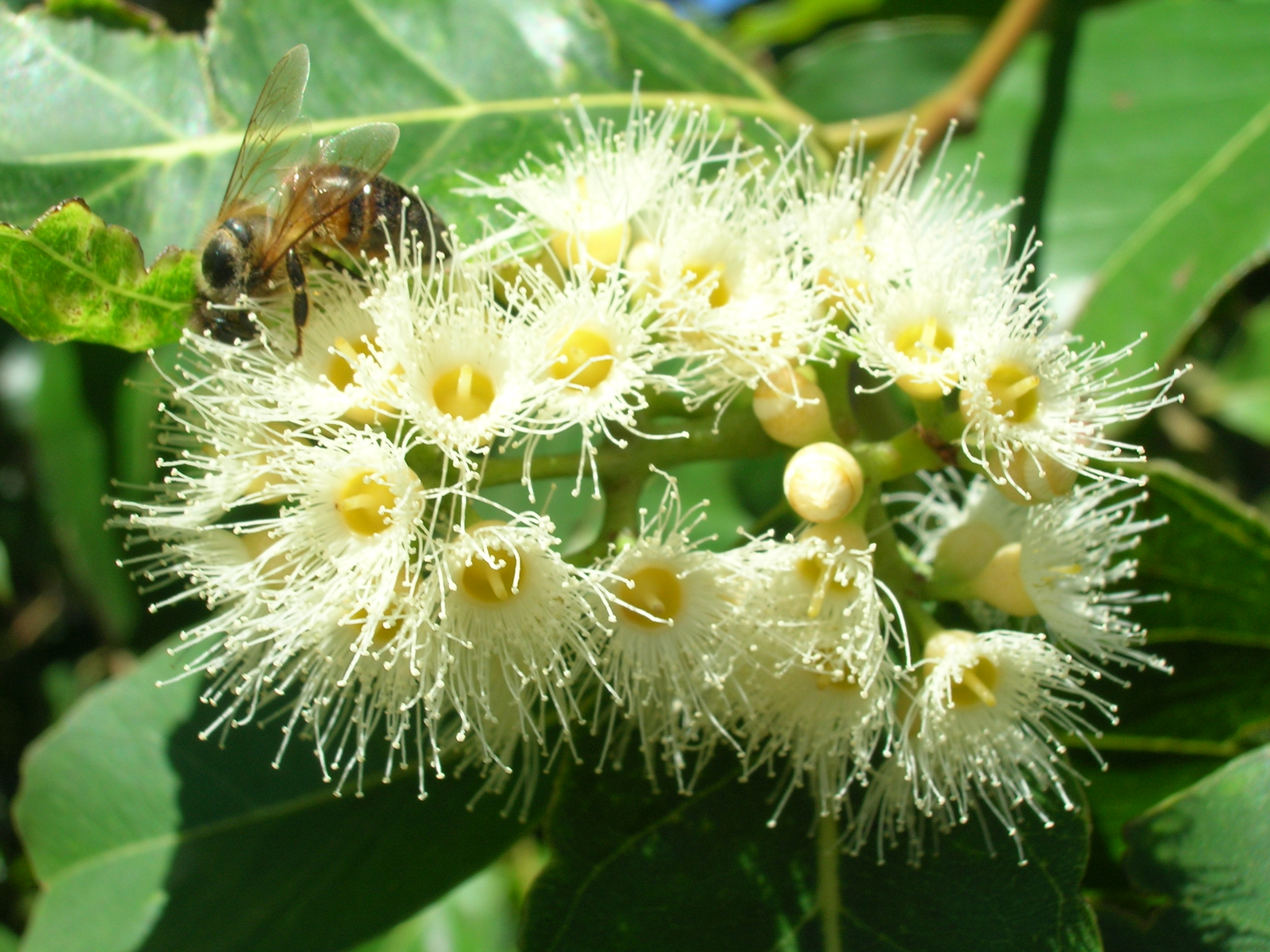
Flowers of Eucalyptus deglupta

=== Wallacea ===
It is estimated that there are over 10,000 species of plants in this biodiversity hotspot region. About 1,200 species and 12 genera are endemic. The island of Sulawesi has about 500 endemic plant species. The islands of Molucca have about 300 endemic plant species and the Lesser Sunda Islands are home to at least 110 endemic plant species. Little is known about the flora of this region. Three of these unique species, Agathis, Pterocarpus indicus and Eucalyptus deglupta, are examples.

=== Papua Barat and Papua ===
The flora of this region is influenced by the Australian continent. This region contains a wide array of environments, from snow-capped mountains, lowland wetlands, to tropical marine environment. This geographical variation results in a large diversity of plant species. In 2020, a group of 99 researchers published a checklist of the flora of New Guinea, presenting a total number of 13,634 species that occur on the island with 7,616 species occurring in the Indonesian part, the Papua Barat and Papua Provinces. An astonishing 60-90% of them may be endemic to New Guinea and according to recent estimation the endemic plants encompasses 68% of the total known species. This region has been poorly explored so the actual number of endemic species is unknown.

== Indonesia's national flowers ==
Melati (Jasminum sambac), a small white flower with a sweet fragrance, is the national flower of Indonesia, together with Anggrek Bulan (Phalaenopsis amabilis) and Padma Raksasa Rafflesia (Rafflesia arnoldii). All three were chosen on World Environment Day on 5 June 1990 by President Soeharto. On another occasion Bunga Bangkai (Titan arum, Amorphophallus titanum) was also added as puspa langka together with Rafflesia. Each individual province also has its own floral emblems.

== National Love Flora and Fauna Day ==
To build interest and awareness for Indonesian flora and fauna, the government declared the 5th of November as National Love Flora and Fauna Day. Annually there are postage stamps released in honor of this holiday. They depict plants and animals that are endemic or unique to a specific region or a province of Indonesia.

== Current issues ==
Deforestation is a major problem in Indonesia. The current rate is a loss of 2 million hectares per year. As a highly populous, developing country that is industrializing rapidly, the need of natural resources and land is steadily increasing. Illegally created wildfires cause heavy smog around Indonesia's neighbouring countries. The widespread deforestation and other environmental destruction in Indonesia has often been described by academics as an ecocide.

According to the Indonesian department of forestry, there are currently 174 plants endemic to Indonesia listed as endangered species.

== See also ==
- List of Indonesian floral emblems
- List of national parks of Indonesia
- Geography of Indonesia
- Fauna of Indonesia
- The useful plants of the Dutch East Indies
