= Fauna of Indonesia =

Native animals of Indonesia

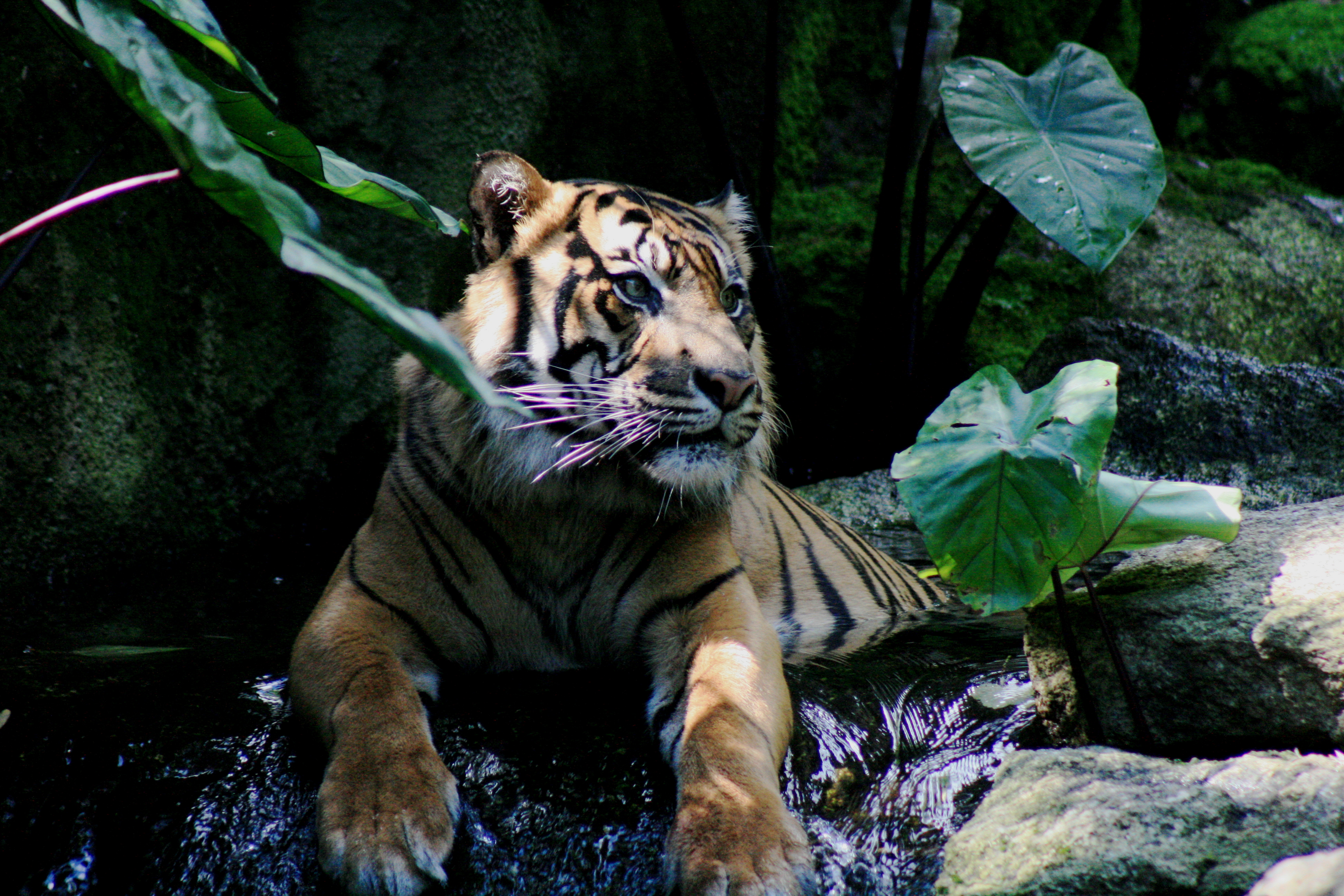
The Sumatran tiger, the smallest tiger subspecies, is only found in Indonesia.

The fauna of Indonesia is characterised by high levels of biodiversity and endemicity due to its distribution over a vast tropical archipelago. Indonesia divides into two ecological regions; western Indonesia which is more influenced by Asian fauna, and the east which is more influenced by Australasian species.

The Wallace Line, around which lies the Wallacea transitional region, notionally divides the two regions. There is diverse range of ecosystems, including beaches, sand dunes, estuaries, mangroves, coral reefs, sea grass beds, coastal mudflats, tidal flats, algal beds, and small island ecosystems.

Environmental issues due to Indonesia's rapid industrialisation process and high population growth, have seen lower priority given to preserving ecosystems. Issues include illegal logging, with resulting deforestation, and a high level of urbanisation, air pollution, garbage management and waste water services also contributing to the forest deterioration. The widespread deforestation and other environmental destruction in Indonesia has often been described by academics as an ecocide.

== Origin of Indonesian fauna ==
The origin of fauna in Indonesia was determined by geographical and geological events on the Asian continental landmass and the Australasian continental landmass (now Australia).

In the nineteenth century, Alfred Russel Wallace proposed the idea of the Wallace Line, a notional line following deep water straits dividing the Indonesian archipelago into two regions, the mainland Asian zoogeographical region (Sundaland) and the Australasian-influenced zoogeographical region (Wallacea). The line runs between Borneo and Sulawesi; and between Bali and Lombok. Although the distance from Bali to Lombok is a relatively short 35 kilometres, the fauna distribution is affected by the line. For example, a group of birds would refuse to cross even the smallest stretches of open water.

== Deforestation ==
Environmental issues due to Indonesia's rapid industrialisation process and high population growth, have seen lower priority given to preserving ecosystems. Issues include illegal logging, with resulting deforestation, and a high level of urbanisation, air pollution, garbage management and waste water services also contributing to the forest deterioration. The widespread deforestation and other environmental destruction in Indonesia has often been described by academics as an ecocide.

== Sundaland ==
Sundaland includes Sumatra, Java, Borneo and the smaller surrounding islands, whose fauna share similar characteristics with the mainland Asian fauna. During the ice age, lower sea levels connected the Asian continent with the western Indonesian archipelago. This enabled animals from the Asian mainland to migrate over dry land to Sundaland.

=== Mammals ===
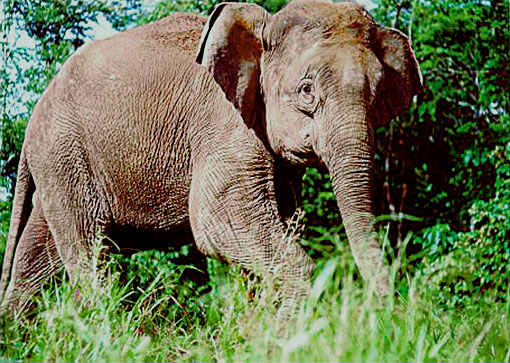
The Borneo elephant, an Asian elephant subspecies.

Sundaland harbours 381 mammal species, of which 173 are endemic to this region. Three of the orangutan species, Bornean orangutan (Pongo pygmaeus), Sumatran orangutan (P. abelii) and Tapanuli orangutan (P. tapanuliensis) are listed in the IUCN red lists.

=== Reptiles and amphibians ===
449 species in 125 genera of reptiles are estimated to live in Sundaland.

=== Fish ===
Around 1000 fish species are known to live in the rivers, lakes, and swamps of Sundaland. Borneo has about 430 species, with 164 of them considered endemic. Sumatra has 270 species, 42 of which are endemic.

== Wallacea ==
Wallacea is the group of islands within red area. The Weber Line is in blue.

Wallacea represents the biogeographical transitional zone between Sundaland to the west and the Australasian zone to the east. It has not been directly connected to either region, due to the deep water straits at its borders, and so could only be colonised by over-water dispersal. This zone covers of about 338,494 km^{2} (130,693 sq mi) land area in total, divided in multiple small islands.

Due to its distinct and varied geography this region contains many endemic and unique species of flora and fauna and has been divided into a number of distinct ecoregions; the mountain and lowland areas of Sulawesi, North Maluku, Buru and Seram in Maluku, the Lesser Sunda Islands (with Sumba a distinct ecoregion in its own right), Timor, and the islands in the Banda Sea.

=== Mammals ===
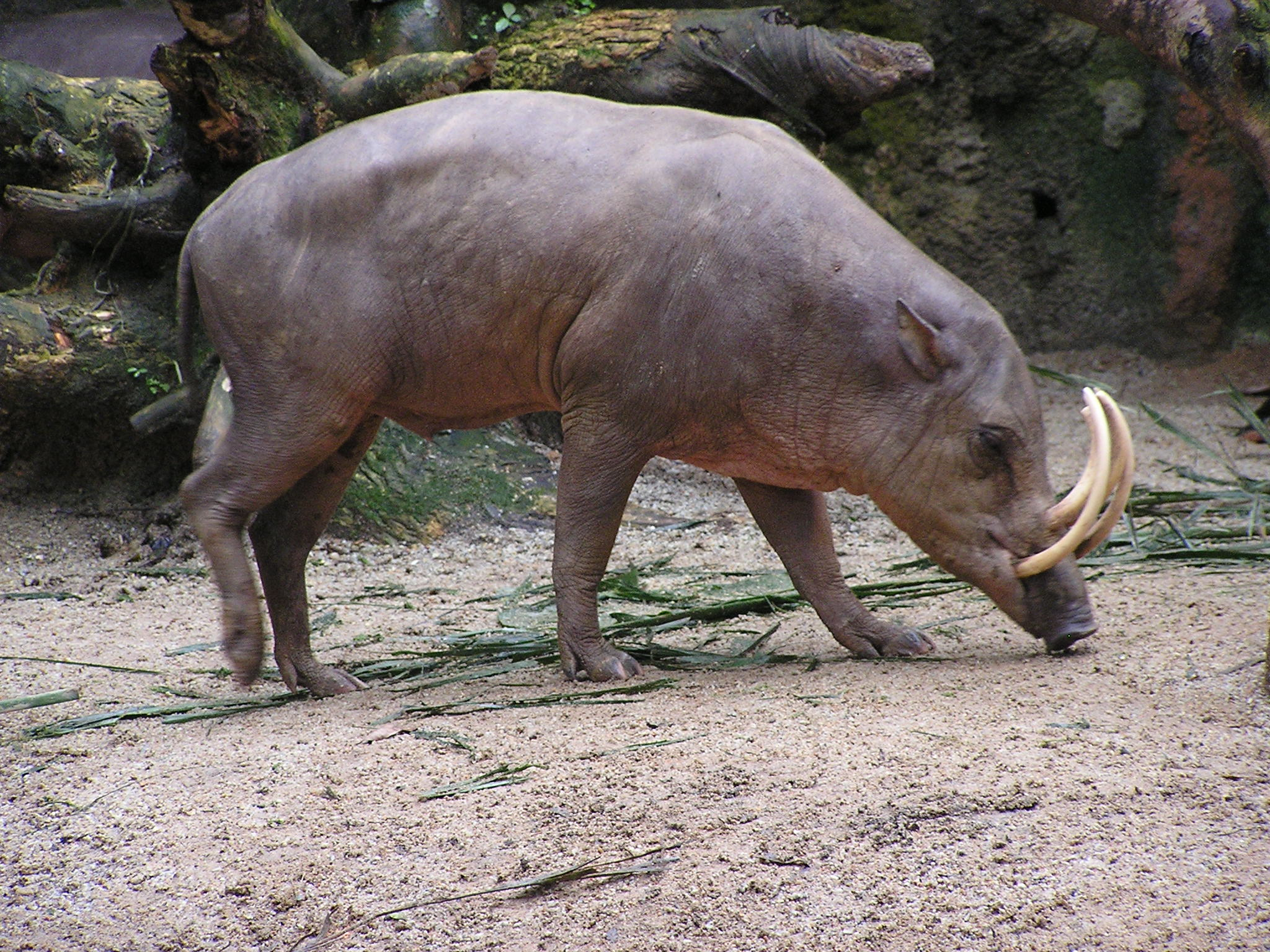
A male North Sulawesi babirusa. Babirusa are notable for the long upper canines in the males.

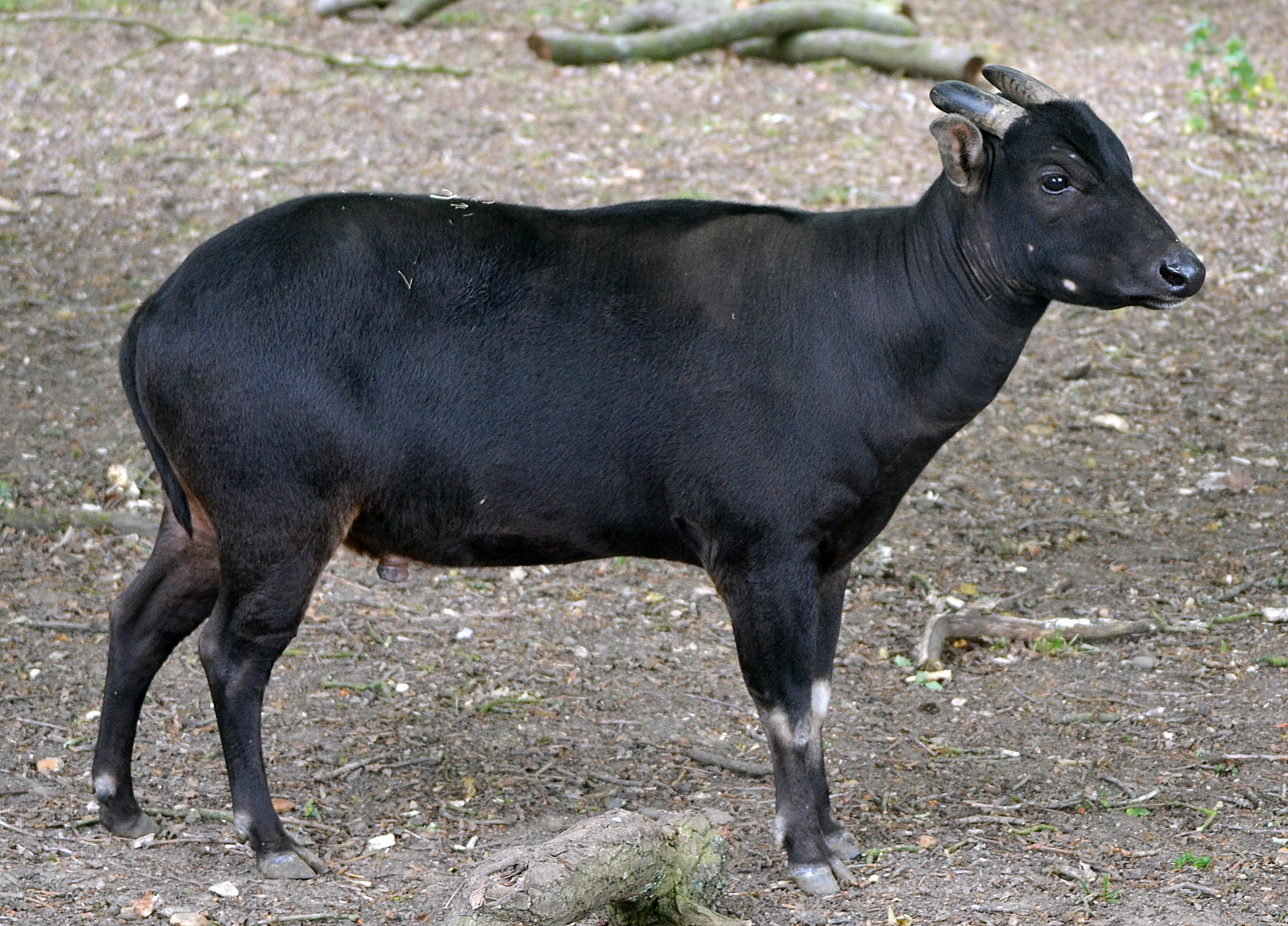
Lowland anoa.

Wallacea harbours a total of 223 native mammal species, including 124 bat species; 126 mammals are endemic to this region.

=== Birds ===
The maleo (Macrocephalon maleo) occurs entirely within Wallacea.

=== Reptiles and amphibians ===
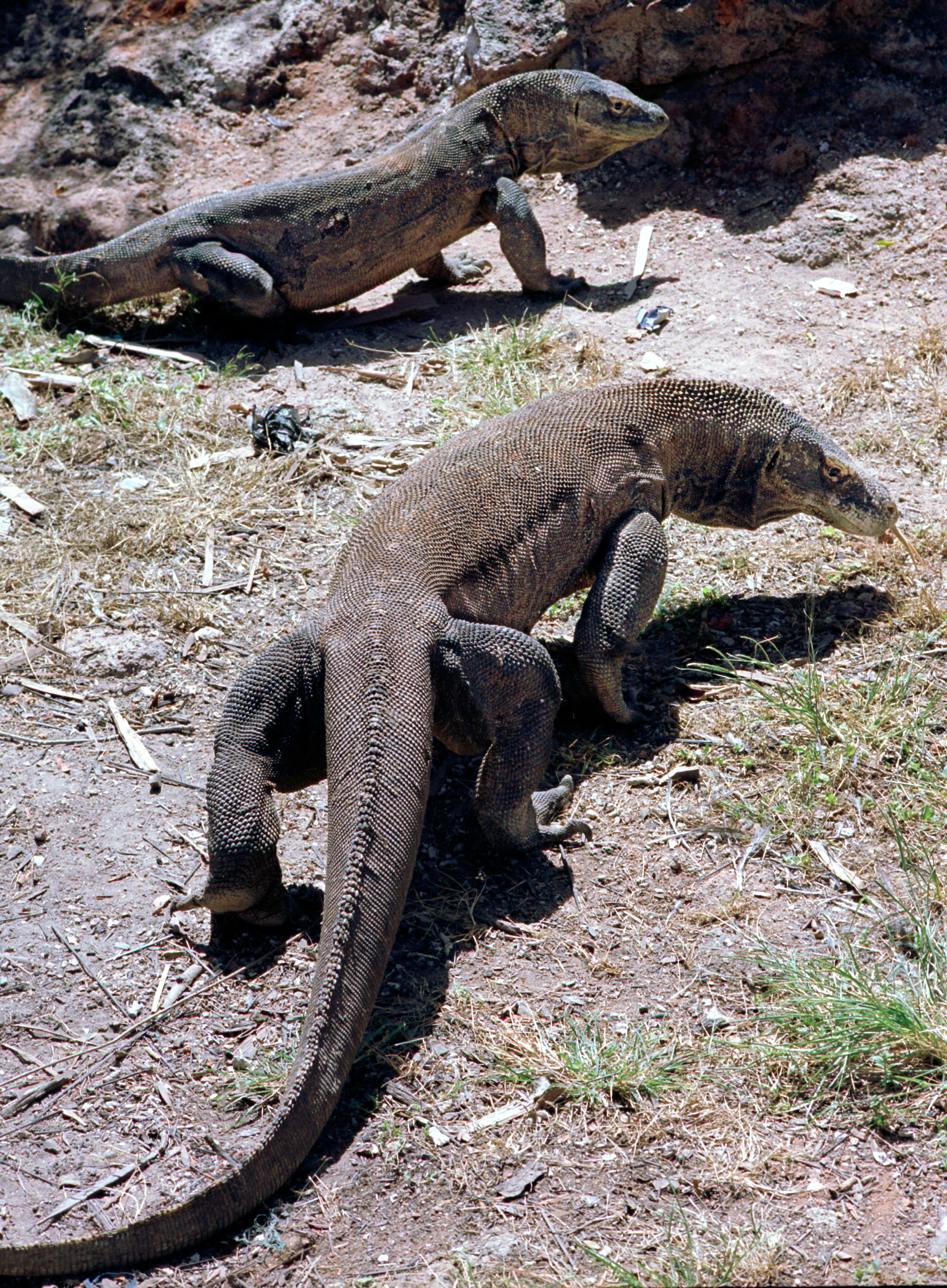
Komodo dragons

With 222 species, of which 99 are endemic, Wallacea has high reptile diversity. Among these are 118 lizard species, of which 60 are endemic; 98 snake species, 58 native species of amphibians occur in Wallacea, of which 32 are endemic.

=== Freshwater fishes ===
There are about 310 species of fish recorded from the rivers and lakes of Wallacea, 75 species of them are endemic. Although little is still known about the fishes of the Moluccas and the Lesser Sunda Islands, 6 species are recorded as endemic. On Sulawesi, there are 69 known species, of which 53 are endemic. The Malili lakes in South Sulawesi, with its complex of deep lakes, rapids and rivers, have at least 15 endemic telmatherinid fishes, two of them representing endemic genera, three endemic Oryzias, two endemic halfbeaks, and seven endemic gobies.

=== Invertebrate ===
There are about 82 species of birdwing butterflies recorded in Wallacea, 44 of them are endemic.

== Western New Guinea ==
The fauna of this region comprises a huge diversity of mammals, reptiles, birds, fishes, invertebrates and amphibians, many species of which are of Australasian origin. Ecoregions here include; the mountains of Bird's Head Peninsula West Papua, the lowlands of West Papua and Papua, the Biak Islands, Yapen island, the lowlands of New Guinea's northern coast, the mountain ranges behind the northern coast, medium and high elevations of the New Guinea Highlands, the lowlands and the swamplands of the southern coast, and finally areas of mangrove swamp scattered around the coast.

== Conservation ==
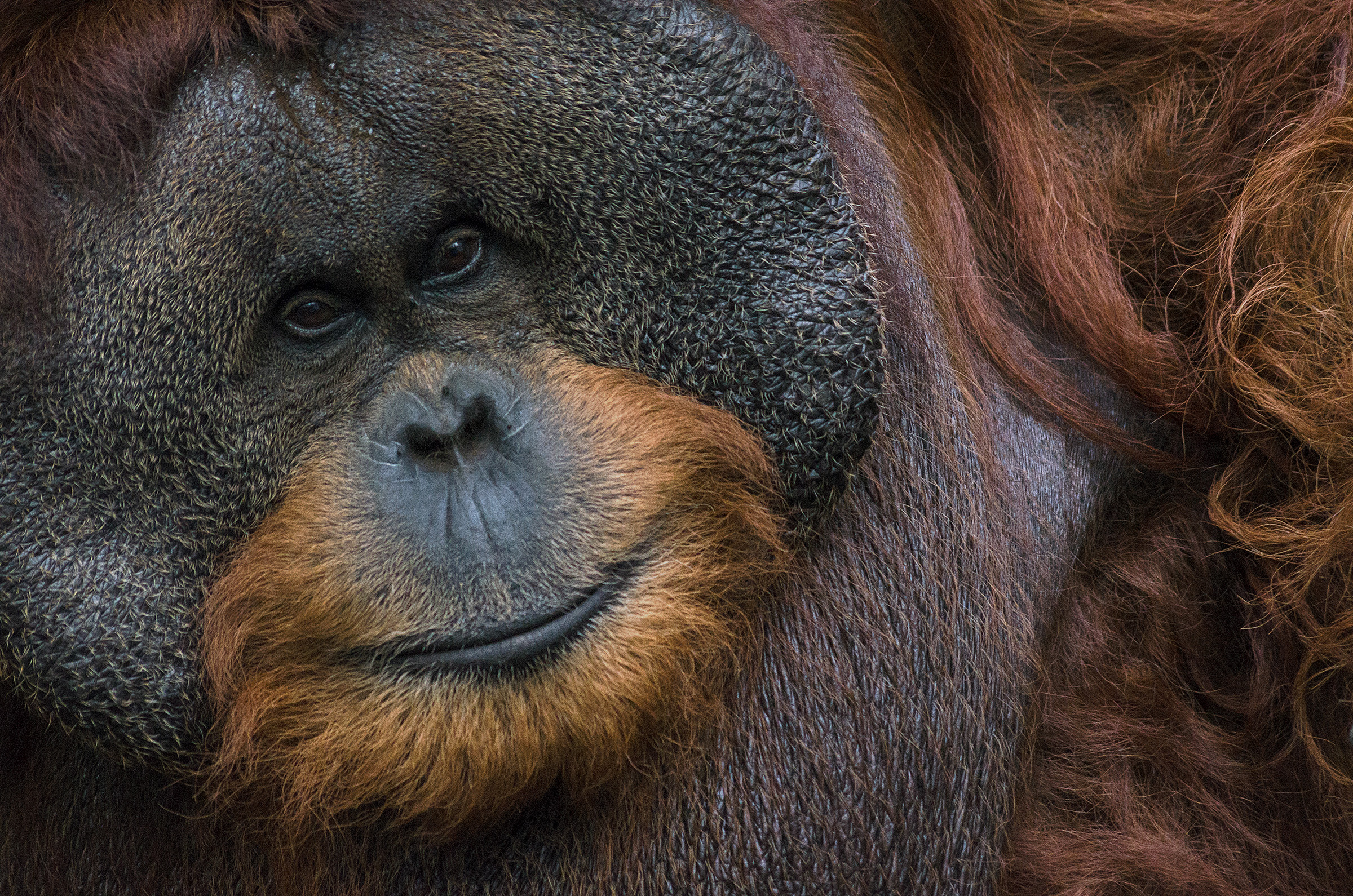
The critically endangered Bornean orangutan

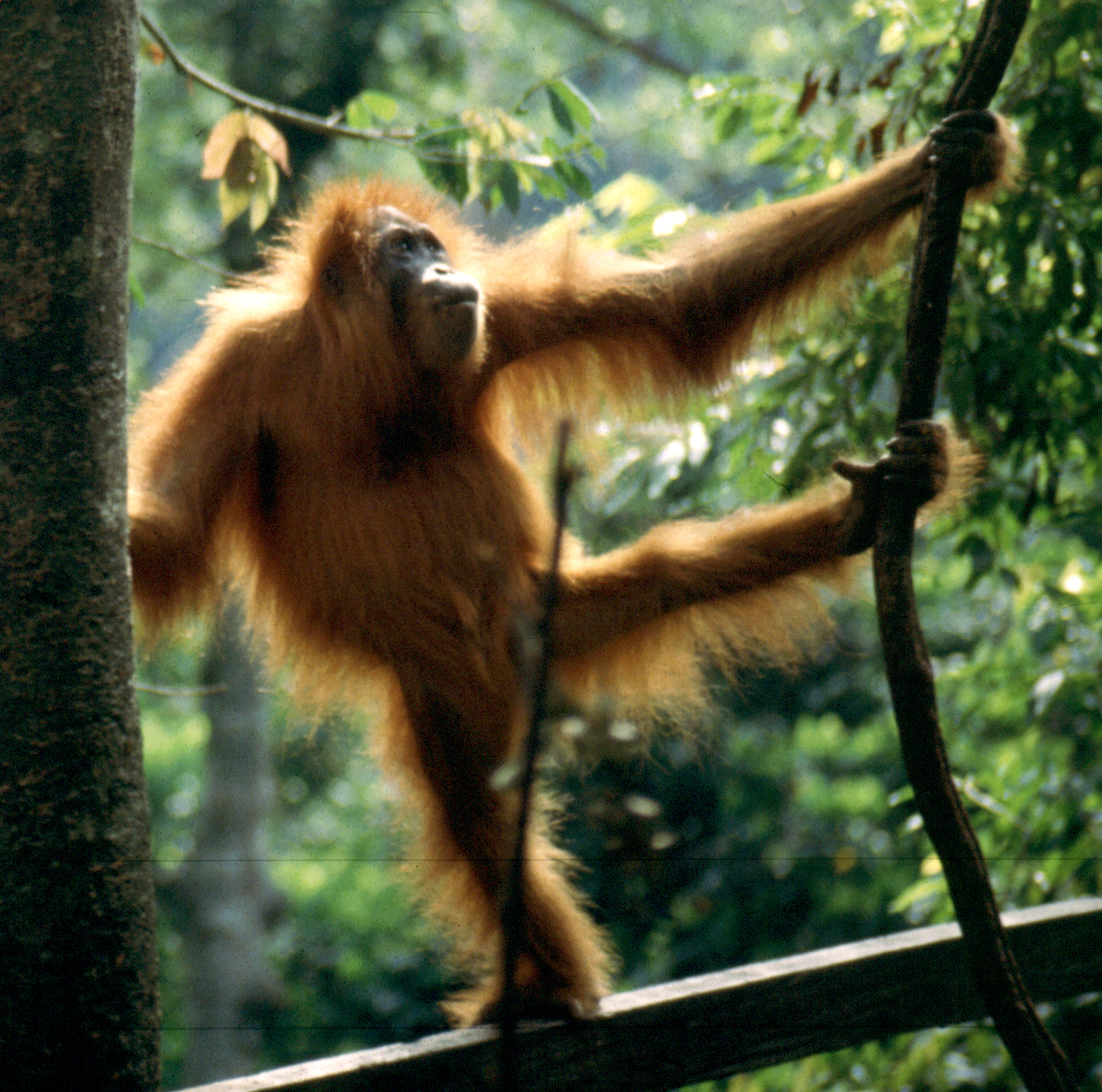
The critically endangered Sumatran orangutan, a great ape endemic to Indonesia.

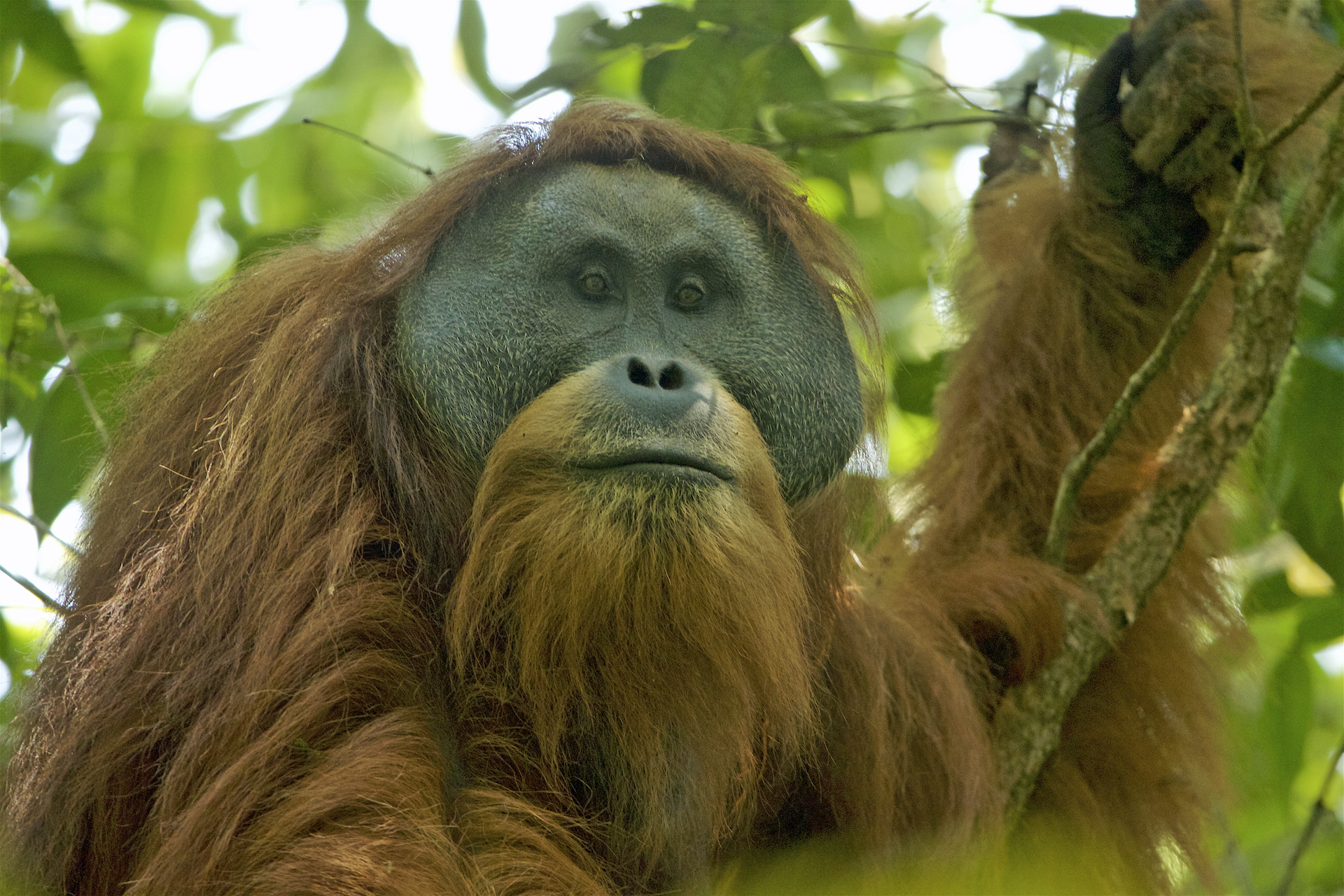
The recently identified Tapanuli orangutan

45% of Indonesia is uninhabited and covered by tropical forests, however, a high population growth and industrialisation, has affected the existence of fauna in Indonesia. The wildlife trade has had a detrimental effect on Indonesia's fauna, including rhinoceroses, orangutans, tigers, elephants, and certain species of amphibians.

Up to 95% of animals sold in markets are taken directly from the wild, rather than from captive breeding stock; and more than 20% of the animals died in transportation. As of 2003, The World Conservation Union lists as endangered 147 mammals, 114 birds, 91 fish and two invertebrate species.

Some habitats have been protected since the early 20th century firstly under Dutch Colonial law. Indonesia's first national parks were established in 1980, and in 2009 there were 50 declared national parks.

== Endangered primates ==
Around 40 primates of the 200 primate species in the world are found in Indonesian forests. Four Indonesian primates were included among the 25 most endangered primates in the world; they are the Sumatran orangutan (Pongo abelii), the Siau Island tarsier (Tarsius tumpara), the Javan slow loris (Nycticebus javanicus) and the pig-tailed langur (Simias concolor).

== Extinct animals ==
The Bali and Javan tiger populations were eradicated between the 1950s and 1970s.

== See also ==
- List of Indonesian animal emblems
- List of Indonesian floral emblems
- List of mammals of Indonesia
- List of Indonesian birds
  - Endemic birds of Indonesia
  - List of Indonesian birds: non-passerines
  - List of Indonesian birds: passerines
- Fauna of Borneo
- List of national parks of Indonesia
- Flora of Indonesia
- Geography of Indonesia
