= Joseph Arnold =

Naval surgeon and naturalist (1782–1818)

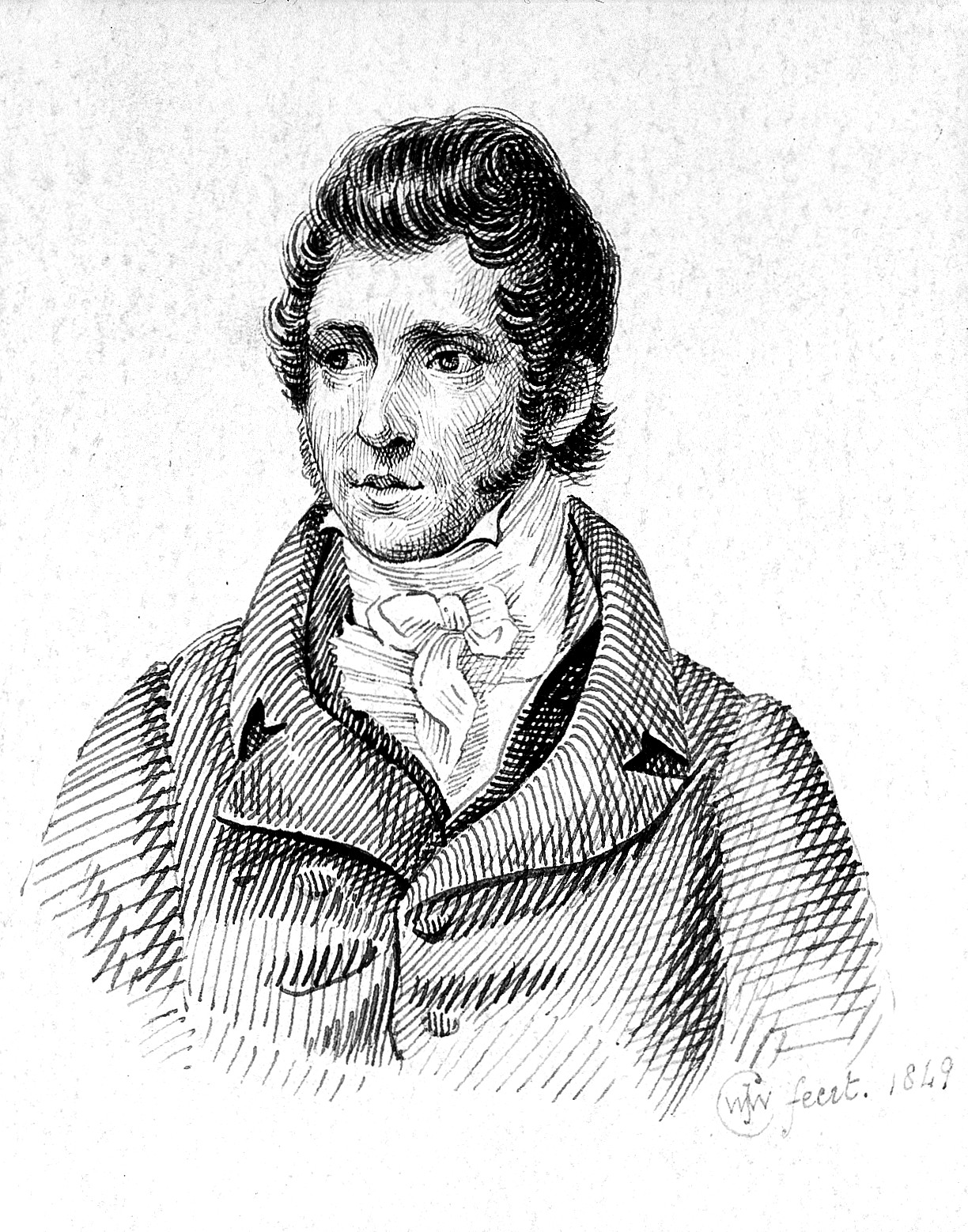
- Joseph Arnold
- Born: 28 December 1782; Beccles, Suffolk
- Died: 26 July 1818 (aged 35); Sumatra
- Scientific career
- Fields: Natural history

Joseph Arnold (28 December 1782 – 26 July 1818 in Padang, Sumatra, Netherlands East Indies) was a naval surgeon and naturalist. He was the first to bring to notice to English botany, the parasitic plant with one of the world's largest flowers, Rafflesia arnoldii, which was named after him posthumously. His specimen collection is in the museum of the Linnean Society.

Born in Beccles, Suffolk, the fourth son of Edward Arnold, a tanner and Hannah (d. 1786). He was schooled at John Leman's Free School and at the age of sixteen apprenticed to apothecary William Crowfoot. Arnold learned surgery in Edinburgh and received an MD in 1806. with a thesis on De Hydrothorace also known as dropsy of the chest. He joined the Royal Navy and was posted assistant surgeon on HMS Victory from April 1808 to February 1809. After recovering from typhus at Portsmouth, he was posted as surgeon on HMS Hindostan. This sailed to Sydney via the Cape of Good Hope and returned Cape Horn and Rio de Janeiro, commanded by William Bligh who offered to introduce Arnold to Sir Joseph Banks in London. In 1811, he was posted to Haslar Hospital in Portsmouth to handle patients with malignant fever. He then served aboard HMS Alcmene, HMS Hibernia, and HMS America around the Mediterranean, during which period he made a visit to the crater of Vesuvius. A meeting with Alexander Macleay made him interested in South American insects and he chose an appointment in 1814 as surgeon superintendent aboard the female convict vessel HMS Northumberland and went collecting insects on reaching Rio de Janeiro. He reached Sydney in 1815. After 1815, he unsuccessfully tried to work as surgeon in Sydney, and upon his return trip to England aboard the Indefatigable he was stranded in Batavia and the ship caught fire with Arnold losing most of his possessions. He was aided by Charles Assey, also from Beccles, and stayed at Bogor and collected some specimens. He returned to England in May 1816 during which time he met Dawson Turner. In 1818, he worked with Sir Stamford Raffles sailing with him in November 1817 from Falmouth aboard the Lady Raffles and assisted Lady Raffles en route in giving birth to her first child. They reached Benkulen on 19 March 1818. Arnold then travelled on to Passemah Ulu Manna. It is thought that he may have contracted malaria on this journey. Despite being ill, he helped the wife of Captain Thomas Otho Travers and then returned to Benkulen on 8 July 1818. He then recovered and set out to the Menangkabau highlands. It was only when Stamford Raffles visited Padang on 30 July that they learned of Arnold's death four days earlier. His burial site was never documented and has never been located.

The largest flowering plant, Rafflesia arnoldii, was discovered by an Indonesian guide working for him and later named in Arnold's honour. Arnold found the plant at Pulao Lebar on 19 May 1818 and wrote a letter to Raffles on 9 July 1818. The scientific name was assigned to it by Robert Brown two years later. Dawson Turner commissioned a memorial by Francis Chantrey to Arnold at the Beccles Parish Church.

The memorial includes the inscription (with errors in the dates):

In Memory of Joseph Arnold M.D. Surgeon in the Royal Navy,
And Fellow of the Linnean Society of London, and of the Royal Medical Society of Edinburgh,
Who, after having, in the Pursuit of Science and His Profession, Circumnavigated the Globe,
And Suffered Numerous Privations and been Exposed to Many Dangers by Sea and Land, Fell a Victim to the
Pestilential Climate of Sumatra, at the moment of Entering upon the Career Most Congenial to his Wishes,
Having been Appointed Naturalist in that Island to the Honourable East India Company.
He was born at Beccles A.D. 1784 and died in Sumatra July 19th 1818.

Reader! If Entire Devotion to the Cause of Science,
Unbiassed by Interest, Unchecked by Perils, Unappalled by Disease,
If Genuine Simplicity of Character, and if the kindest Disposition,
Joined to the Most Steady Attachment,
Can Excite Thy Respect, Thy Admiration, And Thy Regret, Those
Feelings are due to him for whose Name
This Marble Strives to Ensure a Short Existence:
His Virtues are Happily Recorded in the Everlasting Tablets of God.
