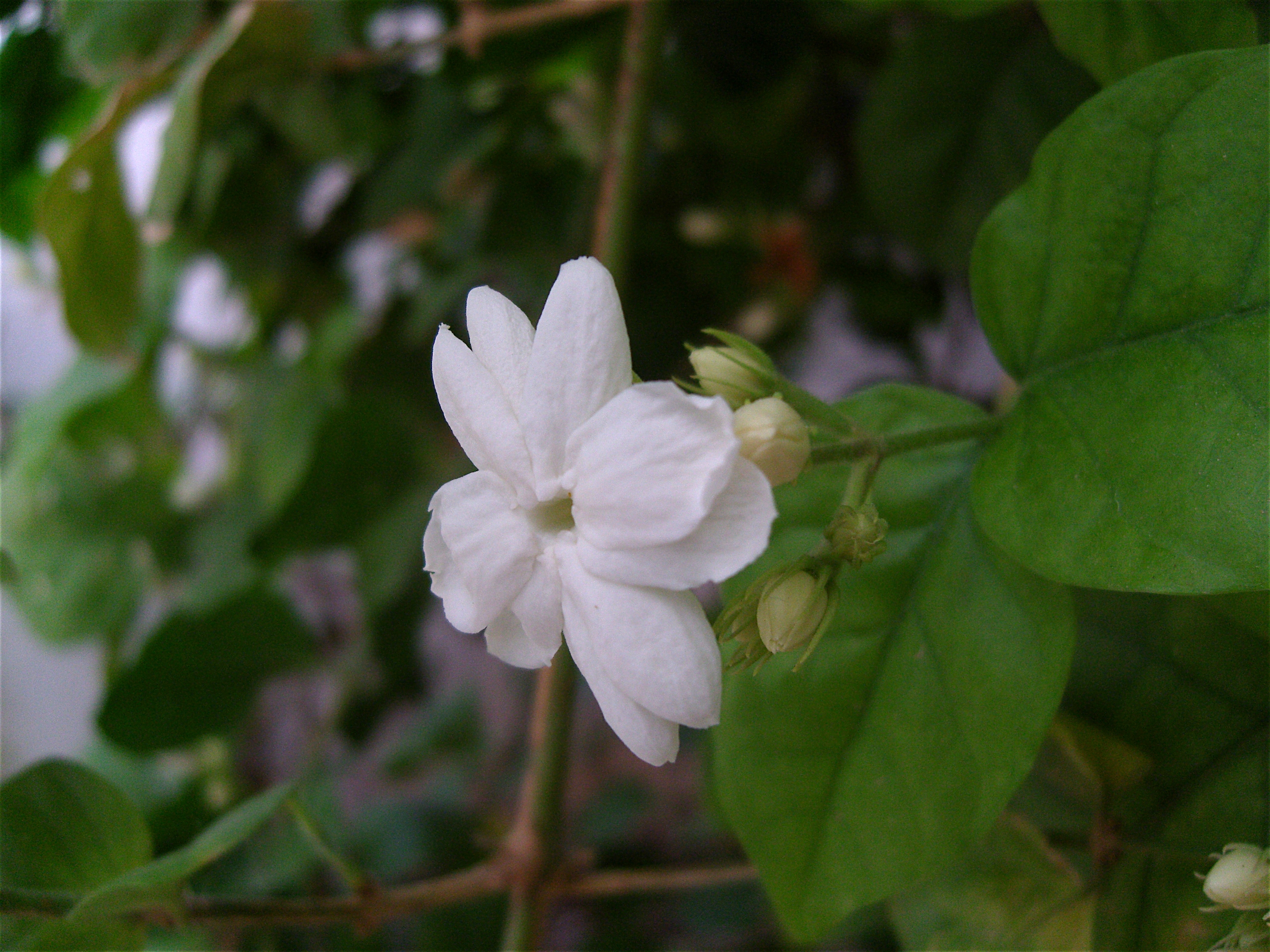
- A 'Maid of Orleans' cultivar from Tunisia
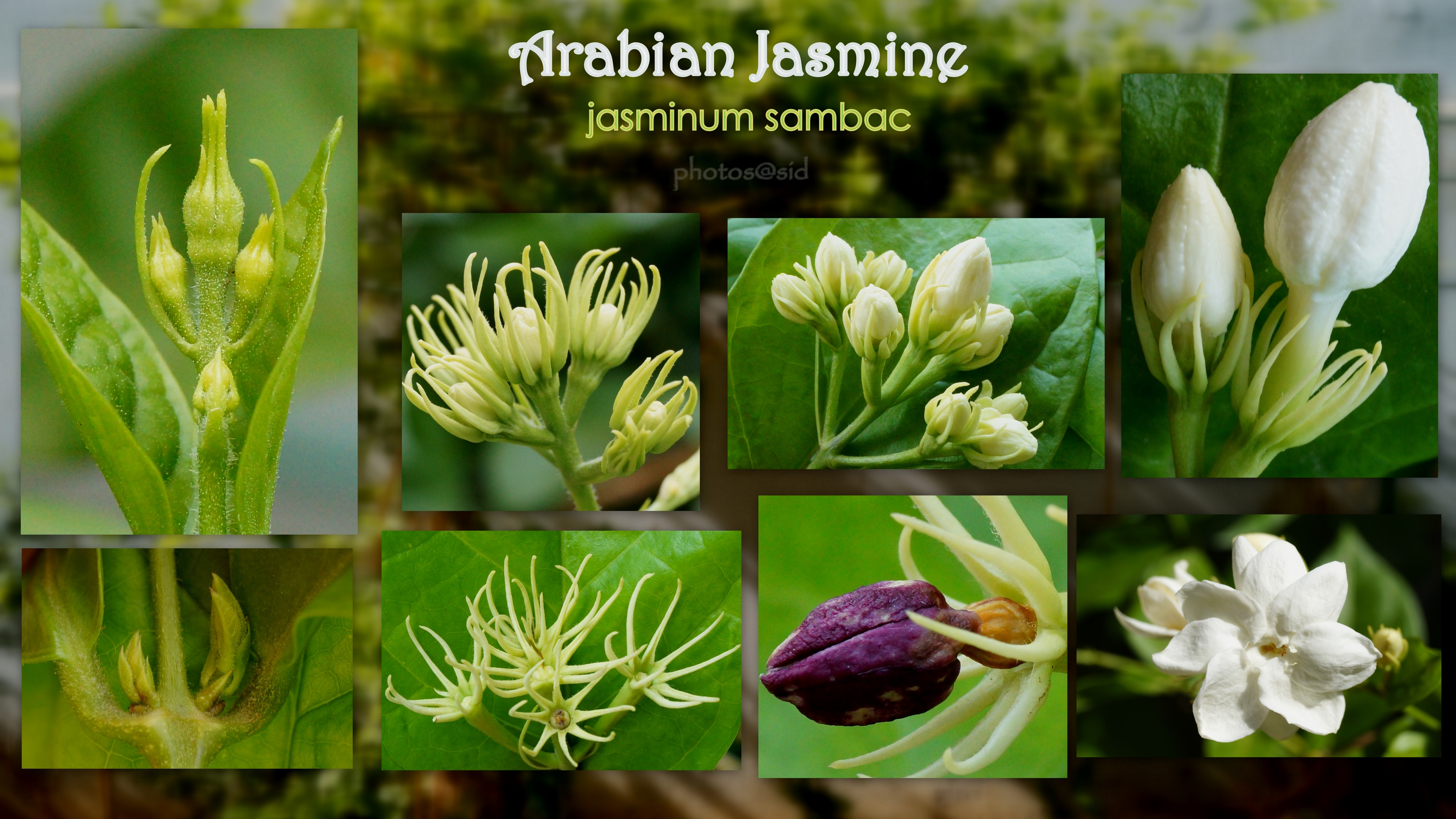
- Various flower stages

Scientific classification
- Kingdom: Plantae
- Clade: Tracheophytes
- Clade: Angiosperms
- Clade: Eudicots
- Clade: Asterids
- Order: Lamiales
- Family: Oleaceae
- Genus: Jasminum
- Species: J. sambac

Binomial name
- Jasminum sambac (L.) Aiton

Synonyms
- Basionym: Nyctanthes sambac L.; Homotypic: Mogorium sambac (L.) Lam.; Jasminum fragrans Salisb.; Jasminum sambac var. normale Kuntze); Heterotypic: Jasminum bicorollatum Noronha; Jasminum blancoi Hassk.; Jasminum heyneanum Wall. ex G.Don; Jasminum odoratum Noronha; Jasminum pubescens Buch.-Ham. ex Wall.; Jasminum quadrifolium Buch.-Ham. ex Wall.; Jasminum quinqueflorum B.Heyne ex G.Don; Jasminum quinqueflorum var. pubescens G.Don; Jasminum sambac var. duplex Voigt; Jasminum sambac var. gimea (Zuccagni) DC.; Jasminum sambac var. goaense (Zuccagni) DC.; Jasminum sambac var. heyneanum Wall. ex G.Don) C.B.Clarke in J.D.Hooker; Jasminum sambac var. kerianum Kuntze; Jasminum sambac var. nemocalyx Kuntze; Jasminum sambac var. plenum Stokes; Jasminum sambac var. syringifolium Wall. ex Kuntze; Jasminum sambac var. trifoliatum Vahl; Jasminum sambac var. undulatum (L.) Kuntze; Jasminum sambac var. verum DC.; Jasminum sanjurium Buch.-Ham. ex DC.; Jasminum undulatum (L.) Willd.; Mogorium gimea Zuccagni; Mogorium goaense Zuccagni; Mogorium undulatum (L.) Lam.; Nyctanthes goa Steud.; Nyctanthes grandiflora Lour.; Nyctanthes undulata L.

= Jasminum sambac =

Species of jasmine

Jasminum sambac (Arabian jasmine or Sambac jasmine or Mogra) is a species of jasmine native to Bhutan and India. It is cultivated in many places, especially West Asia, South Asia and Southeast Asia. It is naturalised in many scattered locales: Mauritius, Madagascar, the Maldives, Christmas Island, Chiapas, Central America, southern Florida, the Bahamas, Cuba, Hispaniola, Jamaica, Puerto Rico, and the Lesser Antilles.

Jasminum sambac is a small shrub or vine growing up to 0.5 to 3 m (1.6 to 9.8 ft) in height. It is widely cultivated for its attractive and sweetly fragrant flowers. The flowers may be used as a fragrant ingredient in perfumes and jasmine tea. It is the national flower of the Philippines, where it is known as sampaguita, as well as being one of the three national flowers of Indonesia, where it is known as melati putih.

== Description ==
Jasminum sambac is an evergreen vine or shrub reaching up to 0.5 to 3 m (1.6 to 9.8 ft) tall. The species is highly variable, possibly a result of spontaneous mutation, natural hybridization, and autopolyploidy. Cultivated Jasminum sambac generally do not bear seeds and the plant is reproduced solely by cuttings, layering, marcotting, and other methods of asexual propagation.

The leaves are ovate, 4 to 12.5 cm (1.6 to 4.9 in) long and 2 to 7.5 cm (0.79 to 2.95 in) wide. The phyllotaxy is opposite or in whorls of three, simple (not pinnate, like most other jasmines). They are smooth (glabrous) except for a few hairs at the venation on the base of the leaf.

The flowers bloom all throughout the year and are produced in clusters of 3 to 12 together at the ends of branches. They are strongly scented, with a white corolla 2 to 3 cm (0.79 to 1.18 in) in diameter with 5 to 9 lobes. The flowers open at night (usually around 6 to 8 in the evening), and close in the morning, a span of 12 to 20 hours. The fruit is a purple to black berry 1 cm (0.39 in) in diameter.

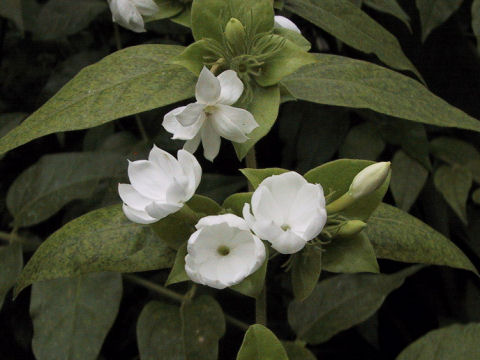
Arabian jasmine in soft shade

== Taxonomy and nomenclature ==
Jasminum sambac is classified under the genus Jasminum under the tribe Jasmineae. It belongs to the olive family Oleaceae.

Jasminum sambac has acquired its English common name, "Arabian jasmine," from being widely cultivated in the Arabian Peninsula. Early Chinese records of the plant points to it being originated in Southeast Asia. Jasminum sambac (and nine other species of the genus) were spread into Arabia and Persia by man, where they were cultivated in gardens. From there, they were introduced to Europe where they were grown as ornamentals and were known under the common name "sambac" in the 18th century.

The Medieval Arabic term "zanbaq" denoted jasmine flower-oil from the flowers of any species of jasmine. This word entered late medieval Latin as "sambacus" and "zambacca" with the same meaning as the Arabic, and then in post-medieval Latin plant taxonomy the word was adopted as a label for the J. sambac species. The J. sambac species is a good source for jasmine flower-oil in terms of the quality of the fragrance and it continues to be cultivated for this purpose for the perfume industry today. The Jasminum officinale species is also cultivated for the same purpose, and probably to a greater extent.

In 1753, Carl Linnaeus first described the plant as Nyctanthes sambac in the first edition of his famous book Systema Naturae. In 1789, William Aiton reclassified the plant to the genus Jasminum. He also coined the common English name of "Arabian jasmine".

== Cultivation ==
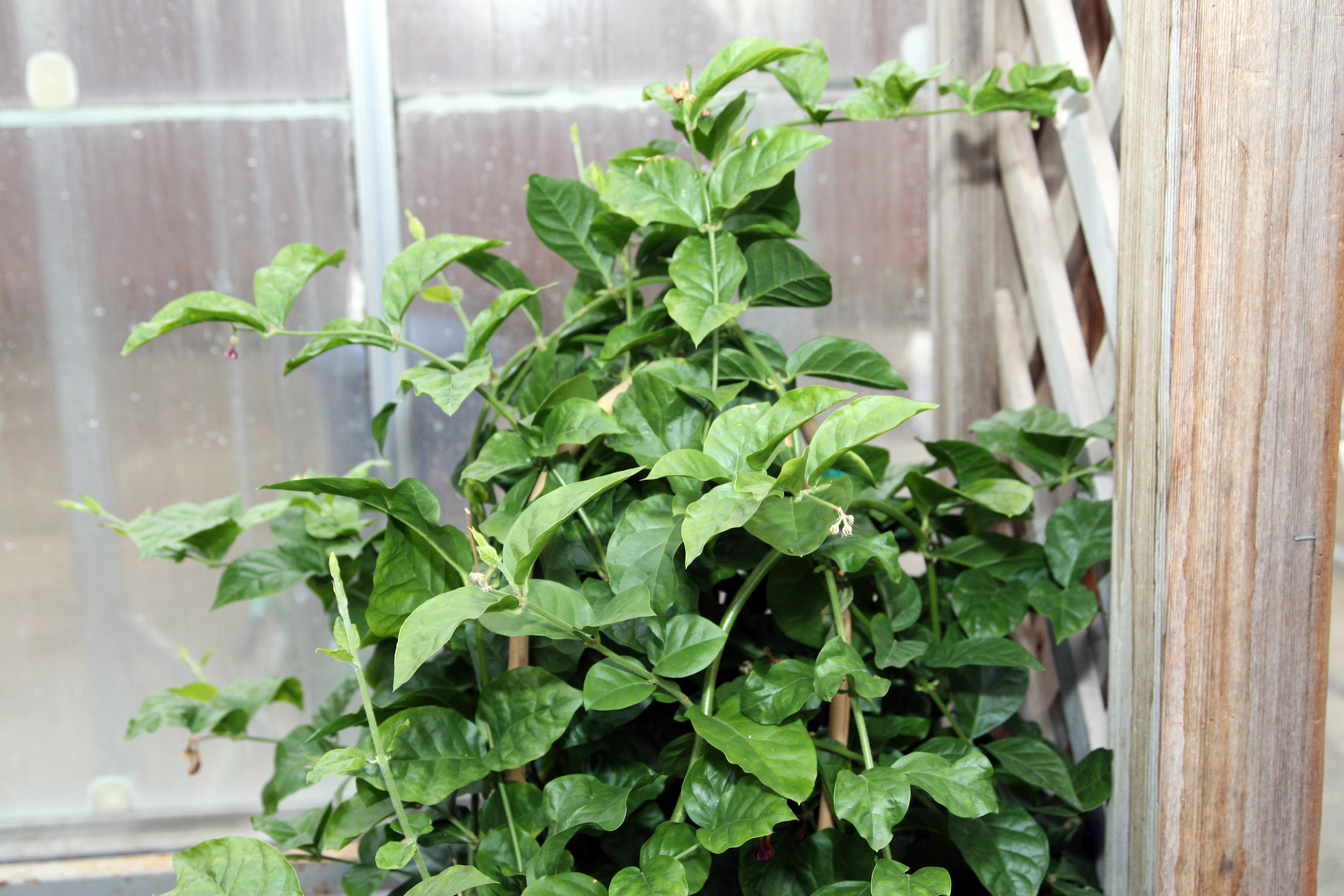
In cultivation

The sweet, heady fragrance of Jasminum sambac is its distinct feature. It is widely grown throughout the tropics from the Arabian Peninsula to Southeast Asia and the Pacific Islands as an ornamental plant and for its strongly scented flowers. Numerous cultivars currently exist.

Typically, the flowers are harvested as buds during early morning. The flower buds are harvested on basis of color, as firmness and size are variable depending on the weather. The buds have to be white, as green ones may not emit the characteristic fragrance they are known for. Open flowers are generally not harvested as a larger amount of them is needed to extract oils and they lose their fragrance sooner.

J. sambac does not tolerate being frozen, so in temperate regions must be grown under glass, in an unheated greenhouse or conservatory. It has an intense fragrance which some people may find overpowering. In the UK this plant has gained the Royal Horticultural Society's Award of Garden Merit.

=== Cultivars ===
Jasminum sambac cultivars

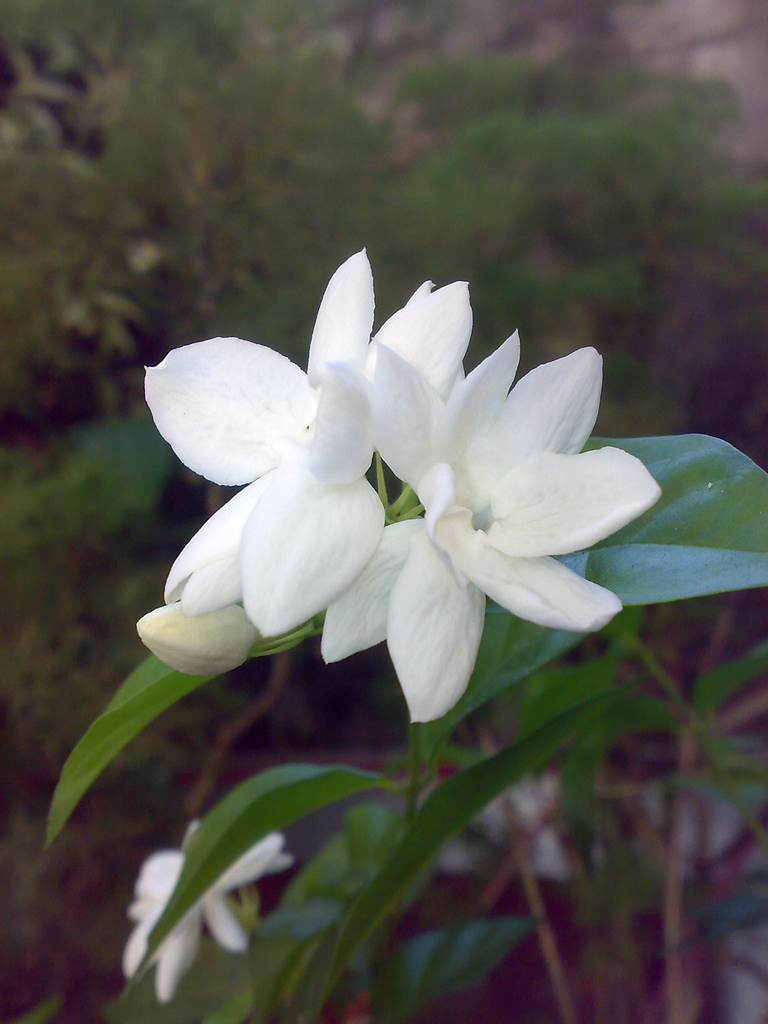
'Maid of Orleans'

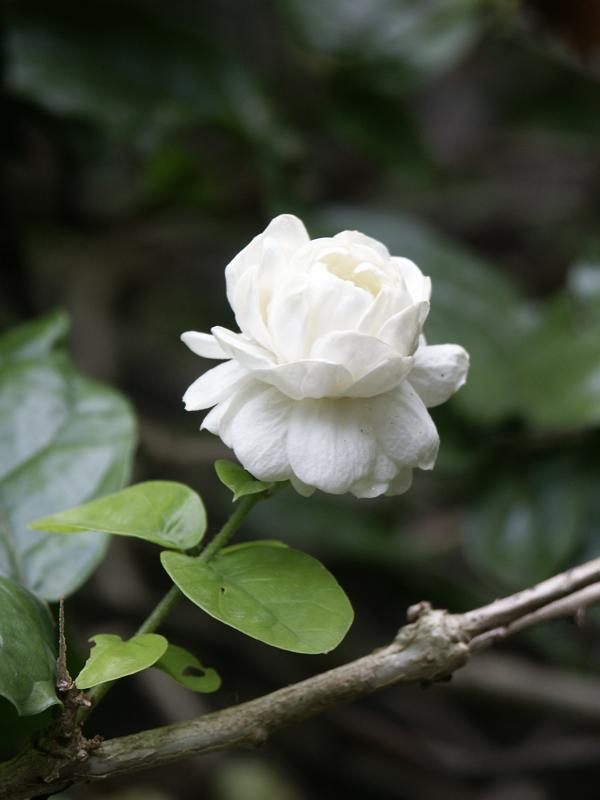
'Grand Duke of Tuscany'

There are numerous cultivars of Jasminum sambac which differ from each other by the shape of leaves and the structure of the corolla. The cultivars recognized include:

- 'Maid of Orleans' – possesses flowers with a single layer of five or more oval shaped petals. It is the variety most commonly referred to as sampaguita and pikake. It is also known as 'Mograw', 'Motiya', or 'Bela'.
- 'Belle of India' – possesses flowers with a single or double layer of elongated petals.
- 'Grand Duke of Tuscany' – possesses flowers with a doubled petal count. They resemble small white roses and are less fragrant than the other varieties. It is also known as 'Rose jasmine' and 'Butt Mograw'. In the Philippines, it is known as kampupot.
- 'Mysore Malli (Mulli)' – resembles the 'Belle of India' cultivar but has slightly shorter petals with distinct and immense fragrance.
- 'Arabian Nights' – possesses a double layer of petals but is smaller in size than the 'Grand Duke of Tuscany' cultivar.

== Chemical composition ==
Jasminum sambac contains dotriacontanoic acid, dotriacontanol, oleanolic acid, daucosterol, hesperidin, and [+]-jasminoids A, B, C, D in its roots. Leaves contains flavonoids such as rutin, quercetin and isoquercetin, flavonoids rhamnoglycosides as well as α-amyrin and β-sitosterol. A novel plant cysteine-rich peptide family named jasmintides were isolated from this plant.

Its aroma is caused by a variety of compounds including benzyl alcohol, methyl benzoate, linalool, benzyl acetate, (-)-(R)-jasmine lactone, (E,E)-α-farnesene, (Z)-3-hexenyl benzoate, N-acetylmethylanthranilate, (E)-methyl jasmonate, benzyl benzoate and isophytol.

== Importance ==
=== Southeast Asia ===
==== Philippines ====
The Jasminum sambac (Filipino and Philippine Spanish: sampaguita) was adopted by the Philippines as the national flower on 1 February 1934 via Proclamation No. 652 issued by American Governor-General Frank Murphy.

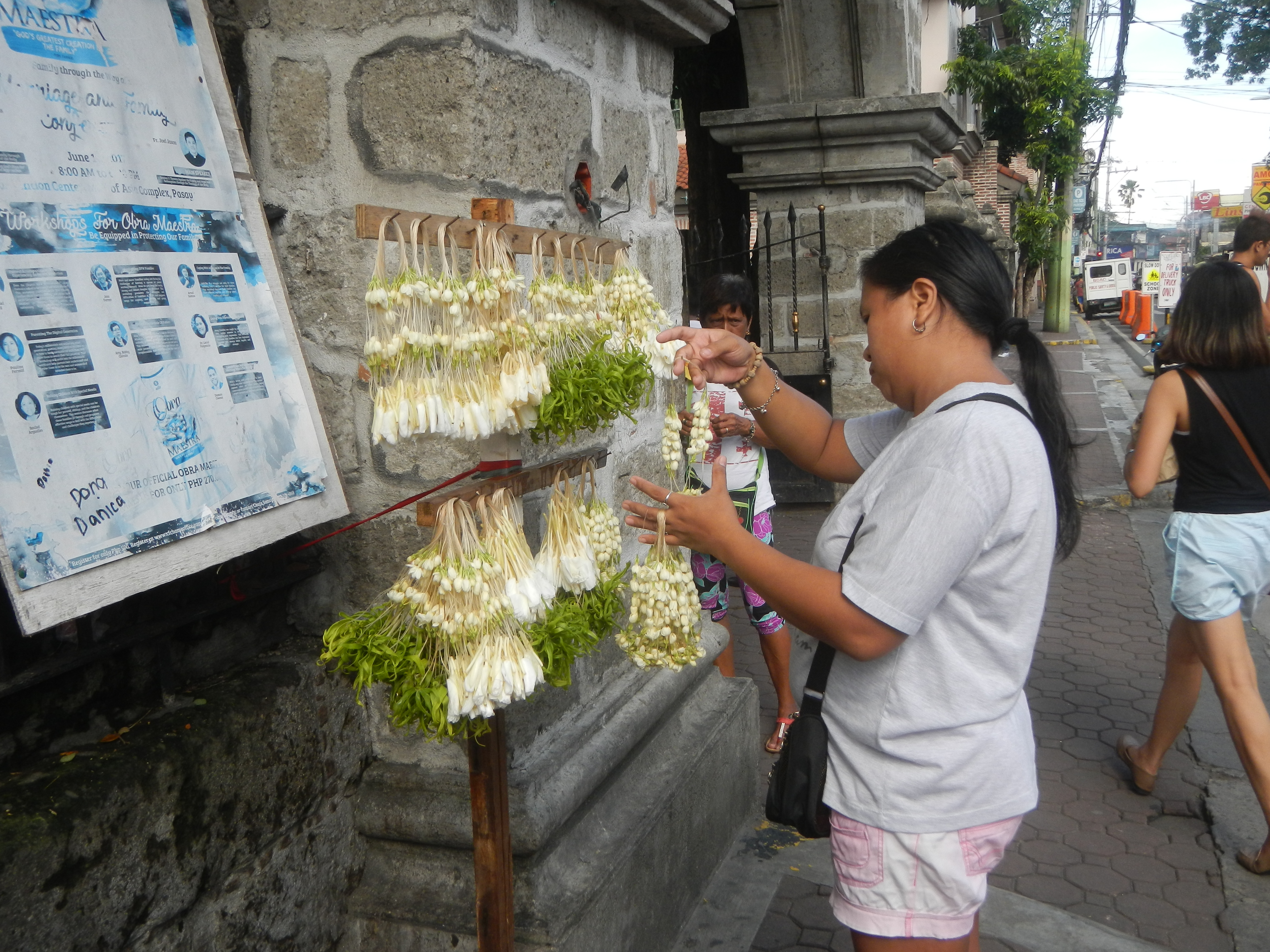
Sampaguita garland vendors outside a Catholic school in Pateros, Manila

Its most widespread modern common name "sampaguita" is derived from the Philippine Spanish sampaguita; from Tagalog sampaga ("jasmine", a direct loanword from the Sanskrit word चम्पक campaka, originally referring to the champac tree), and the Spanish diminutive suffix -ita. It is also by native common names, including kampupot in Tagalog; kulatai, pongso, or kampupot in Kapampangan; manul in the Visayan languages; lumabi or malul in Maguindanao; and hubar or malur in Tausug.

Filipinos string the flowers into leis, corsages, and sometimes crowns. These garlands are available as loose strings of blossoms or as tight clusters of buds, and are commonly sold by vendors outside churches and near street intersections.

Sampaguita garlands are used as a form of bestowing honour, veneration, or accolade. These are primarily used to adorn religious images, religious processions and photographs of the dead on altars. These are placed around the necks of living persons such as dignitaries, visitors, and occasionally to graduating students. Buds strung into ropes several metres long are often used to decorate formal events such state occasions at Malacañang Palace, weddings, and are sometimes used as the ribbon in ribbon cutting ceremonies. Though edible, the flower is rarely used in cuisine, with an unusual example being flavouring for ice cream.

Jasminum sambac is the subject of the danza song La Flor de Manila, composed by Dolores Paterno in 1879. The song was popular during the Commonwealth and is now regarded as a romantic classic. The flower is also the namesake of the song El Collar de Sampaguita. The design of the ceremonial torch for the 2019 Southeast Asian Games, designed by Filipino sculptor Daniel Dela Cruz, was inspired by the sampaguita.

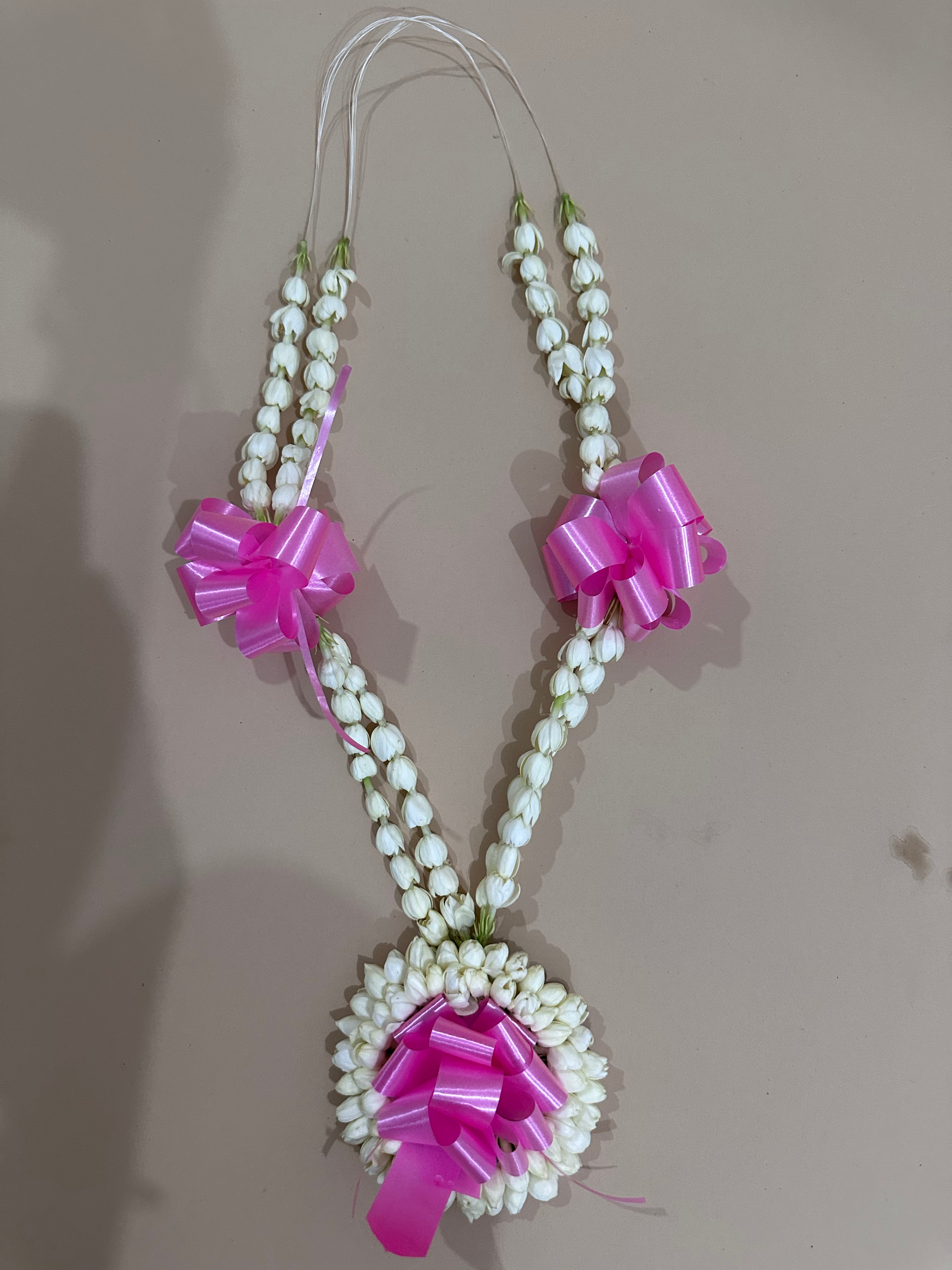
A sampaguita flower necklace purchased in the Philippines

==== Indonesia ====
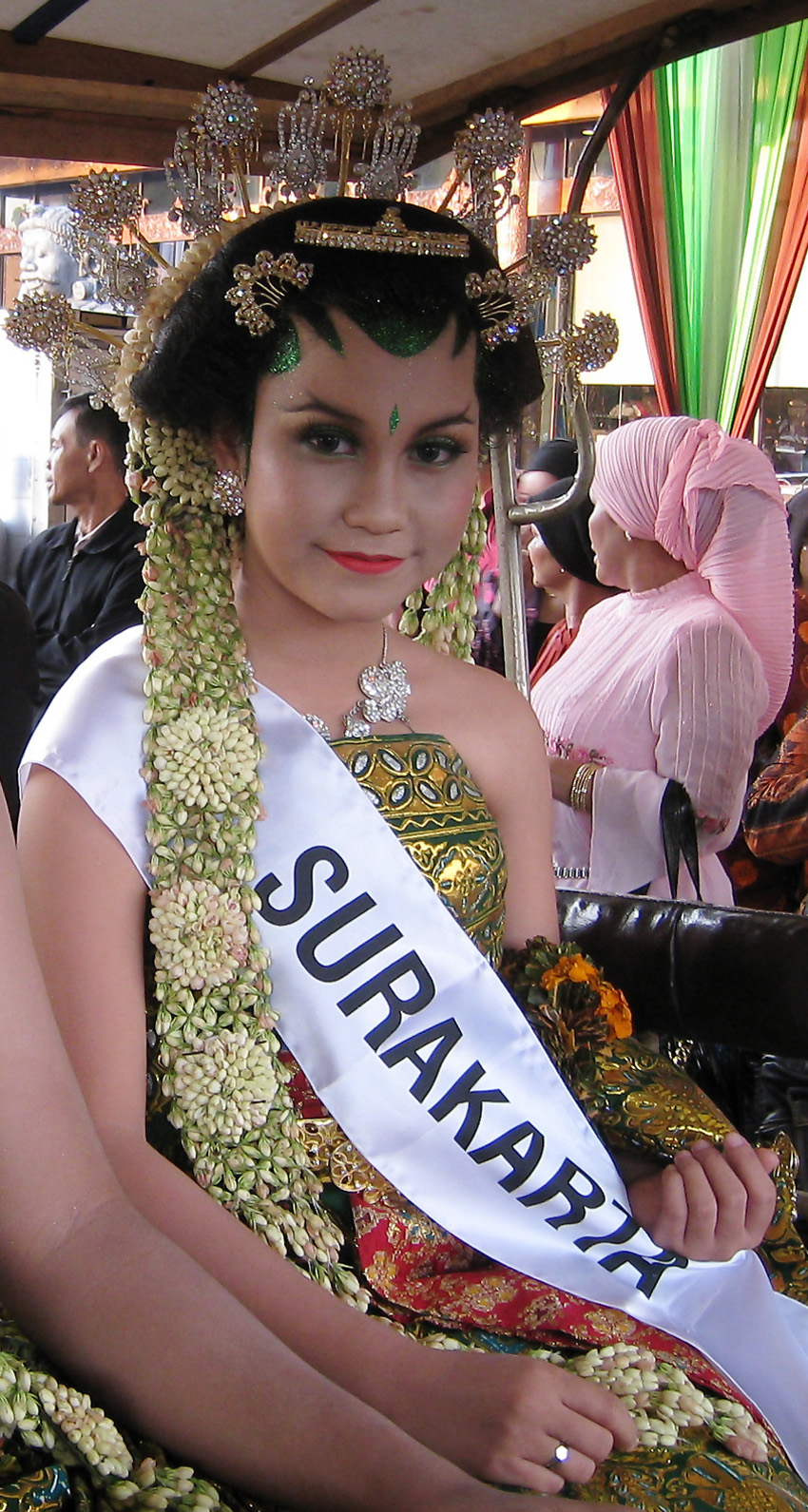
Javanese Surakarta bride adorned with intricate roncen melati (jasmine garland)

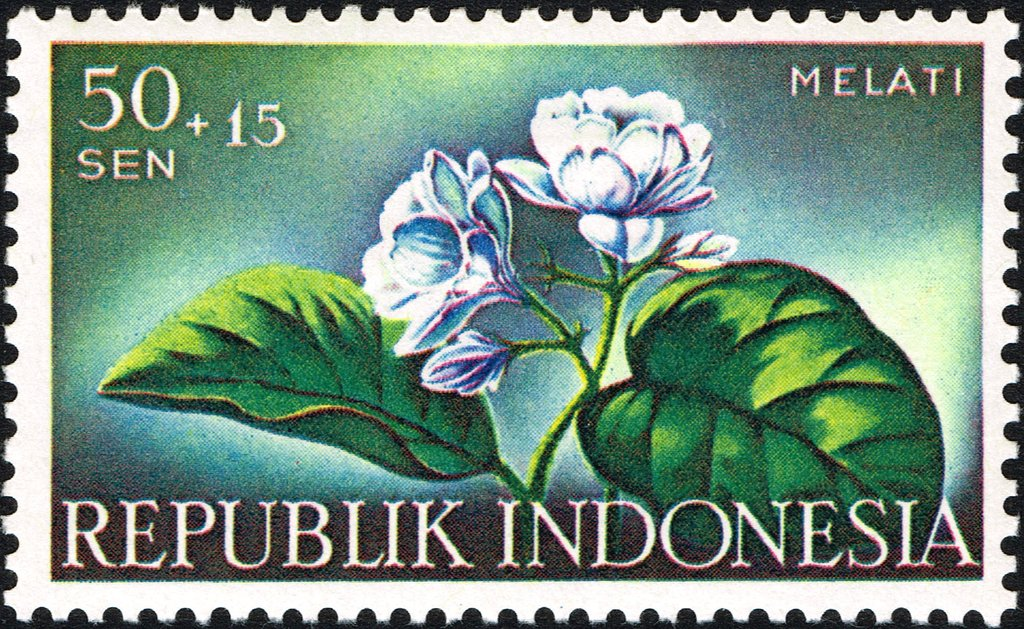
1957 Indonesian stamp of Jasminum sambac

Jasminum sambac (Indonesian: melati putih, lit. 'white melati') is one of the three national flowers in Indonesia, the other two being the moon orchid and the giant padma. Although the official adoption was announced only as recent as 1990 during World Environment Day and enforced by law through Presidential Decree No. 4 in 1993, the importance of Jasminum sambac in Indonesian culture long predates its official adoption. Since the formation of Indonesian republic during the reign of Sukarno, melati putih is always unofficially recognized as the national flower of Indonesia. The reverence and its elevated status is mostly due to the importance of this flower in Indonesian tradition since ancient times.

It has long been considered a sacred flower in Indonesian tradition, as it symbolizes purity, sacredness, and sincerity. It also represents the beauty of modesty; a small and simple white flower that can produce such sweet fragrance. It is also the most prevalent flower in wedding ceremonies for ethnic Indonesians, especially in the island of Java. Jasmine flower buds that have not fully opened are usually picked to create strings of jasmine garlands (Javanese: roncen melati). On wedding days, a traditional Javanese or Sundanese bride's hair is adorned with strings of jasmine garlands arranged as a hairnet to cover the konde (hair bun). The intricately intertwined strings of jasmine garlands are left to hang loose from the bride's head. The groom's kris is also adorned with five jasmine garlands called roncen usus-usus (intestine garlands) to refer its intestine-like form and also linked to the legend of Arya Penangsang. In Makassar and Bugis brides, the hair is also adorned with buds of jasmine that resemble pearls. Jasmine is also used as floral offerings for hyangs, spirits and deities especially among Balinese Hindu, and also often present during funerals. In South Sumatran traditional costume, the bungo melati pattern in Palembang songket fabrics depicts the jasmine to represent beauty and femininity.

The jasmine symbolizes a wide variety of things in Indonesian traditions; it is the flower of life, beauty and festive wedding, yet it is also often associated with spirits and death; the sudden scent of jasmine is often an ominous sign for the superstitious, as it may herald the presence of a ghost or jinn. In Indonesian patriotic songs and poems, the fallen melati is often the representation of fallen heroes that sacrificed their lives and died for the country, a very similar concept to fallen sakura that represents fallen heroes in Japanese tradition. Ismail Marzuki's patriotic song "Melati di Tapal Batas" (jasmine on the border) (1947) and Guruh Sukarnoputra's "Melati Suci" (sacred jasmine) (1974) clearly refer jasmine as the representation of fallen heroes, the eternally fragrant flower that adorned Ibu Pertiwi (Indonesian national personification). Iwan Abdurachman's "Melati Dari Jayagiri" (jasmine from Jayagiri mountain) refers to jasmine as the representation of the pure unspoiled beauty of a girl and also a long-lost love.

In Indonesia, essential oils are extracted from jasmine flowers and buds by using the steam distillation process. Jasmine essential oil is one of the most expensive commodities in the aromatherapy and perfume industry.

==== Cambodia ====
In Cambodia, the flower is used as an offering to the Buddha. During flowering season which begins in June, Cambodians thread the flower buds onto a wooden needle to be presented to the Buddha.

==== Thailand ====
In Thailand, this flower is often strung into a garland for offerings to Buddha. Its name is called in Thai as "mali la" (Thai: มะลิลา) or "mali son" (Thai: มะลิซ้อน). Their names are referenced in central folk songs, until it is widely known and popular. It has been adapted into a sports song. In addition, the flower is also used as a symbol on Mother's Day in Thailand as well which falls on August 12, birthday of Queen Sirikit.

=== East Asia ===
==== China ====
In China, the flower (Chinese: 茉莉花; pinyin: Mòlì huā) is processed and used as the main flavoring ingredient in jasmine tea (茉莉花茶). It is also the subject of a popular folk song Mo Li Hua.

=== Hawaii ===
In Hawaii, the flower is known as pīkake, and is used to make fragrant leis. The name 'pīkake' is derived from the Hawaiian word for "peacock", because the Hawaiian Princess Kaʻiulani was fond of both the flowers and the bird.

=== Middle East ===
In Oman, Jasminum sambac features prominently on a child's first birthday. They are used to make thick garlands used as hair adornments. Flowers are sprinkled on the child's head by other children while chanting "hol hol". The fragrant flowers are also sold packed in between large leaves of the Indian almond (Terminalia catappa) and sewn together with strips of date palm leaves. In Bahrain The flower is made into a pin along with the leaf of a palm tree to commemorate the martyrs of the country, similar to the White Poppy flower. Egyptians sometimes make it into garlands and necklaces.

=== South Asia ===
==== India ====
Jasmine is considered to be a sacred flower in Hinduism. It is one of the most commonly grown ornamentals in India, Bangladesh and Pakistan, where it is native. At Indian weddings, the bride often adorns her hair with garlands made of mogra, either around a bun or wrapped across a braid. However, their usage is not limited to important events. Many women in South India pin fresh strings of Jasmine to their hair every day.

A white Mogra flower bud (Jasminum sambac) with green leaves, photographed in Mumbai, India.

==== Sri Lanka ====
In Sri Lanka it is widely known as pichcha or gaeta pichcha. The name sithapushpa and katarolu are also used in older texts. The flowers are used in Buddhist temples and in ceremonial garlands.

== Toxicity ==
The LD50 of jasmine extract is greater than 5 mg/kg by weight.

== See also ==
- List of Jasminum species
- Jasmine
- Jasminum multiflorum – the Indian jasmine
- Jasminum officinale – the common jasmine
- Cananga odorata, the ylang-ylang, another plant widely used in perfumes
