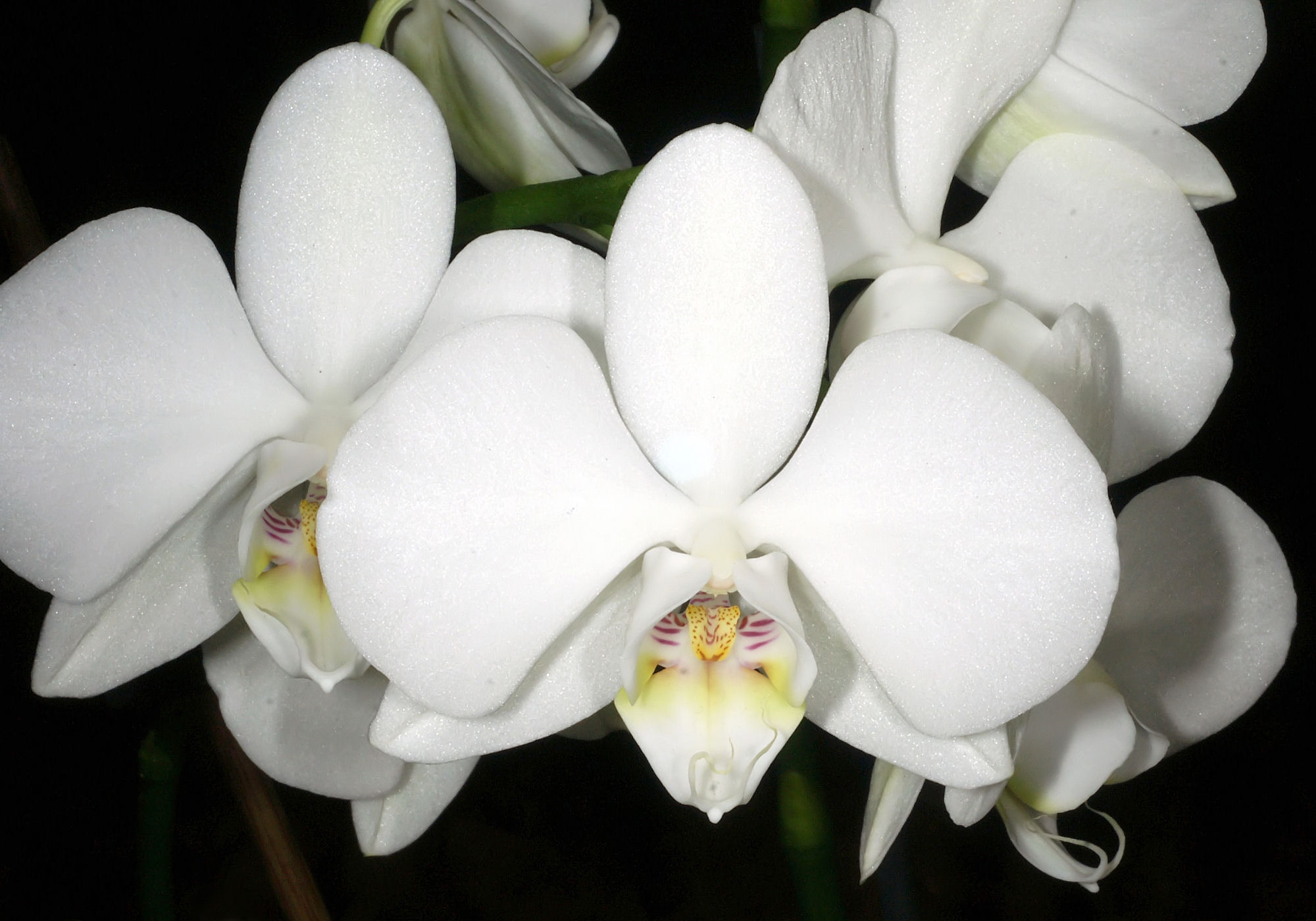

Conservation status
- CITES Appendix II

Scientific classification
- Kingdom: Plantae
- Clade: Tracheophytes
- Clade: Angiosperms
- Clade: Monocots
- Order: Asparagales
- Family: Orchidaceae
- Subfamily: Epidendroideae
- Genus: Phalaenopsis
- Species: P. amabilis

Binomial name
- Phalaenopsis amabilis (L.) Blume

Synonyms
- List: Cymbidium amabile (L.) Roxb.; Epidendrum amabile L.; Synadena amabilis (L.) Raf. Synonyms of Phalaenopsis amabilis subsp. amabilis; Phalaenopsis amabilis f. aurea (R.Warner) O.Gruss; Phalaenopsis amabilis var. aurea (R.Warner) Rolfe; Phalaenopsis amabilis f. concolor Baume & Christenson; Phalaenopsis amabilis f. elysia O.Gruss; Phalaenopsis amabilis var. fournieri Cogn.; Phalaenopsis amabilis f. fuscata (Rchb.f.) O.Gruss & M.Wolff; Phalaenopsis amabilis var. fuscata Rchb.f.; Phalaenopsis amabilis subvar. gloriosa (Rchb.f.) Ames; Phalaenopsis amabilis var. gloriosa (Rchb.f.) Brero; Phalaenopsis amabilis var. grandiflora (Lindl.) Bateman; Phalaenopsis amabilis var. ramosa van Deventer; Phalaenopsis amabilis var. rimestadiana L.Linden; Phalaenopsis amabilis var. rimestadiana-alba Anon.; Phalaenopsis aphrodite var. gloriosa (Rchb.f.) A.H.Kent; Phalaenopsis elisabethae Anon.; Phalaenopsis gloriosa Rchb.f.; Phalaenopsis grandiflora Lindl.; Phalaenopsis grandiflora var. aurea R.Warner; Phalaenopsis grandiflora var. borneensis Corning; Phalaenopsis grandiflora var. fuscata (Rchb.f.) Burb.; Phalaenopsis grandiflora var. gracillima Burb.; Phalaenopsis grandiflora var. ruckeri Burb. nom. nud.; Phalaenopsis rimestadiana (L.Linden) Rolfe Synonyms of Phalaenopsis amabilis subsp. moluccana; Phalaenopsis amabilis var. moluccana Schltr.; Phalaenopsis amabilis var. cinerascens J.J.Sm.; Phalaenopsis celebica Vlooten Synonyms of Phalaenopsis amabilis subsp. rosenstromii; Phalaenopsis amabilis var. rosenstromii (F.M.Bailey) Nicholls; Phalaenopsis rosenstromii F.M.Bailey; Phalaenopsis amabilis var. papuana Schltr.

= Phalaenopsis amabilis =

Species of orchid

Phalaenopsis amabilis, commonly known as moon orchid, moth orchid, or mariposa orchid, is a species of flowering plant in the orchid family Orchidaceae. It is widely cultivated as a decorative houseplant. It is an epiphytic or lithophytic herb with long, thick roots, between two and eight thick, fleshy leaves with their bases hiding the stem and nearly flat, white, long-lasting flowers on a branching flowering stem with up to ten flowers on each branch.

Phalaenopsis amabilis is native to Maritime Southeast Asia, New Guinea, and Australia. It has three subspecies: P. a. amabilis, native to the Philippines (Palawan), Malaysia (Borneo), Indonesia (Borneo, Sumatra, and Java); P. a. moluccana, native to the Maluku Islands (Seram and Buru Islands) and Sulawesi of Indonesia; and P. a. rosenstromii, native to Papua New Guinea and Australia (northeastern Queensland).

Phalaenopsis amabilis is one of the three national flowers of Indonesia, where it is known as anggrek bulan (lit. "moon orchid").

== Description ==
Phalaenopsis amabilis is an epiphytic, rarely lithophytic herb with coarse, flattened, branching roots up to 1 metre (3.3 ft) long and usually 3–4 millimetres (0.12–0.16 in) wide. Between two and eight fleshy, dark green, oblong to egg-shaped leaves 150–300 millimetres (5.9–12 in) long and 40–70 millimetres (1.6–2.8 in) wide are arranged in two rows along the stem. The stem is 100–300 millimetres (3.9–12 in) but hidden by the leaf bases. The flowers are arranged on a stiff, arching flowering stem 300–750 millimetres (12–30 in) long emerging from a leaf base, with a few branches near the tip. Each branch of the flowering stem bears between two and ten white, long-lasting flowers on a stalk (including the ovary) 20–35 millimetres (0.79–1.4 in) long. Each flower is 60–70 millimetres (2.4–2.8 in) long and 50–80 millimetres (2.0–3.1 in) wide with the sepals and petals free from and spreading widely apart from each other. The sepals are egg-shaped, 30–40 millimetres (1.2–1.6 in) long and about 20 millimetres (0.79 in) wide and the petals broadly egg-shaped to almost square, 30–40 millimetres (1.2–1.6 in) long and wide. The labellum is white with yellow and reddish markings, about 25 millimetres (0.98 in) long with three lobes. The side lobes curve upwards and partly surround the column. The middle lobe is cross-shaped with a rounded tip and two long, thread-like wavy arms. There is a large yellow callus near the base of the labellum. Flowering time depends on distribution but occurs from April to December in New Guinea.

== Taxonomy and naming ==
In 1750, before the system of binomial nomenclature had been formalised by Carl Linnaeus, Georg Eberhard Rumphius had collected the species on Ambon Island and described it as Angraecum albus majus in his book Herbarium Amboinense. Linnaeus described it in Species Plantarum giving it the binomial Epidendrum amabile and in 1825, Carl Ludwig Blume changed the name to Phalaenopsis amabilis. The specific epithet (amabilis) is a Latin word meaning "lovely".

There are three subspecies of P. amabilis recognised by Plants of the World Online:

- Phalaenopsis amabilis subsp. amabilis which is the most widespread subspecies and is distinguished from the other subspecies by its cross-shaped labellum middle lobe, the base of which has yellow and red markings;
- Phalaenopsis amabilis subsp. moluccana (Schltr.) Christenson which has a linear-oblong labellum middle lobe, with a slight dilation at its base where there are yellow and white markings;
- Phalaenopsis amabilis subsp. rosenstromii (F.M.Bailey) Christenson which has a relatively short, triangular labellum middle lobe where the markings are yellow;

In Australia, subspecies rosenstromii is recognised as Phalaenopsis rosenstromii by the Australian Plant Census. It was discovered by Gus Rosenstrom "on trees, high from the ground, Daintree River" and was first formally described by Frederick Manson Bailey who published the description in the Queensland Agricultural Journal.

== Distribution and habitat ==
Phalaenopsis amabilis usually grows on trees, rarely on rocks, in rainforest where the humidity is high but there is free air movement. Subspecies amabilis has the widest distribution and occurs from Palawan in the southern Philippines to Borneo, Sumatra and Java. Subspecies moluccana is separated from subspecies amabilis by the Wallace Line and is found in Sulawesi as well as Seram and Buru in the Moluccas. Subspecies rosenstromii is native to New Guinea and Australia where it occurs on the Cape York Peninsula between the Iron Range and the Paluma Range National Park. It is separated from subspecies moluccana by Lydekker's Line.

== Conservation ==
Phalaenopsis rosenstromii was listed as "endangered" under the Australian Government Environment Protection and Biodiversity Conservation Act 1999 but the listing was updated to Phalaenopsis amabilis subsp. rosenstromii in May 2016. The main threat to the subspecies in Australia is illegal collecting.

== Use in horticulture ==
Phalaenopsis amabilis is reported to be very easy to grow as a houseplant, as long as attention is paid to a correct feeding and watering regimen. It thrives in a domestic temperature range of 17–22 °C (63–72 °F), in bright indirect light such as that offered by an east- or west-facing window. Specialist orchid compost and feed is widely available. Species and cultivars in the genus Phalaenopsis are recommended for beginners.

In cultivation in the United Kingdom, Phalaenopsis amabilis has gained the Royal Horticultural Society's Award of Garden Merit.

Phalaenopsis amabilis is one of the parents of Phalaenopsis Harriettiae, reportedly the first man-made Phalaenopsis hybrid, created by John Veitch and recorded in 1887.

== Importance ==
Phalaenopsis amabilis (Indonesian: anggrek bulan meaning "moon orchid") is one of the three national flowers in Indonesia, the other two being the sambac jasmine and padma raksasa. It was officially recognized as national "flower of charm" (Indonesian: puspa pesona) in Presidential Decree No. 4 in 1993.

The orchid is also the official flower of Kota Kinabalu, the capital city of Sabah, Malaysia.
