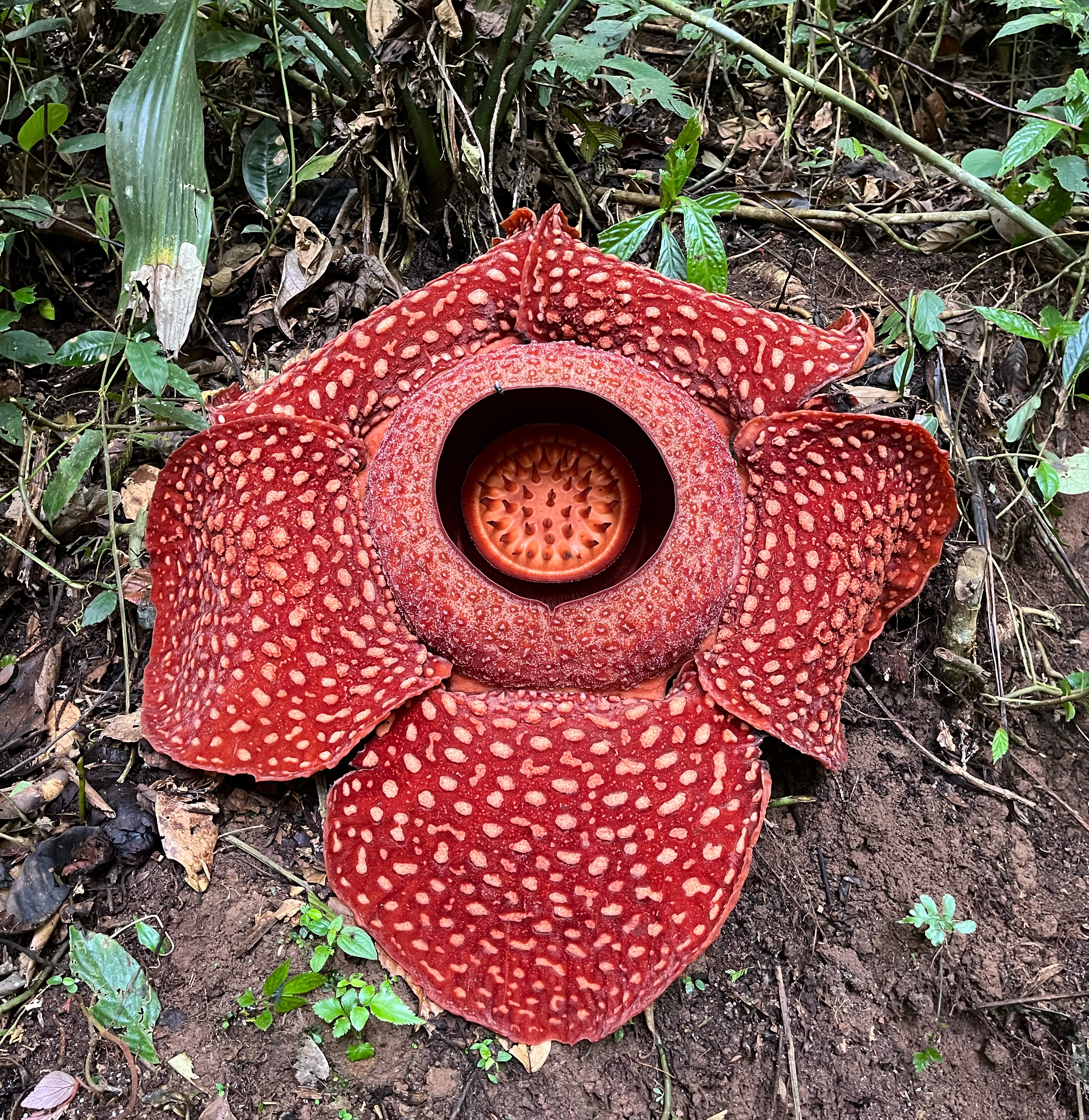
- Flower

Scientific classification
- Kingdom: Plantae
- Clade: Tracheophytes
- Clade: Angiosperms
- Clade: Eudicots
- Clade: Rosids
- Order: Malpighiales
- Family: Rafflesiaceae
- Genus: Rafflesia
- Species: R. arnoldii

Binomial name
- Rafflesia arnoldii R.Br.

Synonyms
- Rafflesia titan Jack

= Rafflesia arnoldii =

Species of flowering plant

Rafflesia arnoldii is a species of flowering plant in the parasitic genus Rafflesia within the family Rafflesiaceae. It is native to the rainforests of Sumatra and Borneo.

It is commonly known as the corpse flower or giant padma. The former name comes from its smell being similar to that of decaying flesh.

It is noted for producing the largest individual flower on Earth. There are plants with larger flowering organs like the titan arum (Amorphophallus titanum) and talipot palm (Corypha umbraculifera); however, those are clusters of many flowers.

Rafflesia arnoldii is one of the three national flowers in Indonesia, the other two being the white jasmine (Jasminum sambac) and moon orchid (Phalaenopsis amabilis). It was officially recognised as a national "rare flower" (Indonesian: puspa langka) in Presidential Decree No. 4 in 1993.

== Taxonomy ==
The first European to find Rafflesia was the ill-fated French explorer Louis Auguste Deschamps. He was a member of a French scientific expedition to Asia and the Pacific, detained by the Dutch for three years on the Indonesian island of Java, where, in 1797, he collected a specimen, which was probably what is now known as R. patma. During the return voyage in 1798, his ship was taken by the British, with whom France was at war, and all his papers and notes were confiscated. Joseph Banks is said to have agitated for the return of the stolen documents, but apparently to no avail; they were lost, turned up for sale around 1860, went to the British Museum of Natural History, where they were promptly lost again. They did not see the light of day until 1954, when they were rediscovered at the Museum. To everyone's surprise, his notes and drawings indicate that he had found and studied the plants long before the British. It is thought quite possible the British purposely hid Deschamps' notes, to claim the 'glory' of 'discovery' for themselves.

In 1818, the British surgeon Joseph Arnold collected a specimen of another Rafflesia species found by a Malay servant in a part of Sumatra, then a British colony called British Bencoolen (now Bengkulu), during an expedition run by the recently appointed Lieutenant-Governor of Bencoolen, Stamford Raffles. Arnold contracted a fever and died soon after the discovery, the preserved material being sent to Banks. Banks passed on the materials, and the honour to study them was given to Robert Brown. The British Museum's resident botanical artist Franz Bauer was commissioned to make illustrations of the new plants. Brown eventually gave a speech before the June 1820 meeting of the Linnean Society of London, where he first introduced the genus and its until then two species. Brown gave the generic name Rafflesia in honour of Raffles. Bauer completed his pictures some time in mid-1821, but the actual article on the subject continued to languish.

William Jack, Arnold's successor in the Sumatran Bencoolen colony, recollected the plant and was the first to officially describe the new species under the name R. titan in 1820. It is thought quite likely that Jack rushed the name to publication because he feared that the French might publish what they knew of the species, and thus rob the British of potential 'glory'. Apparently aware of Jack's work, Brown finally had the article published in the Transactions of the Linnean Society a year later, formally introducing the name R. arnoldii (he ignores Jack's work in his article).

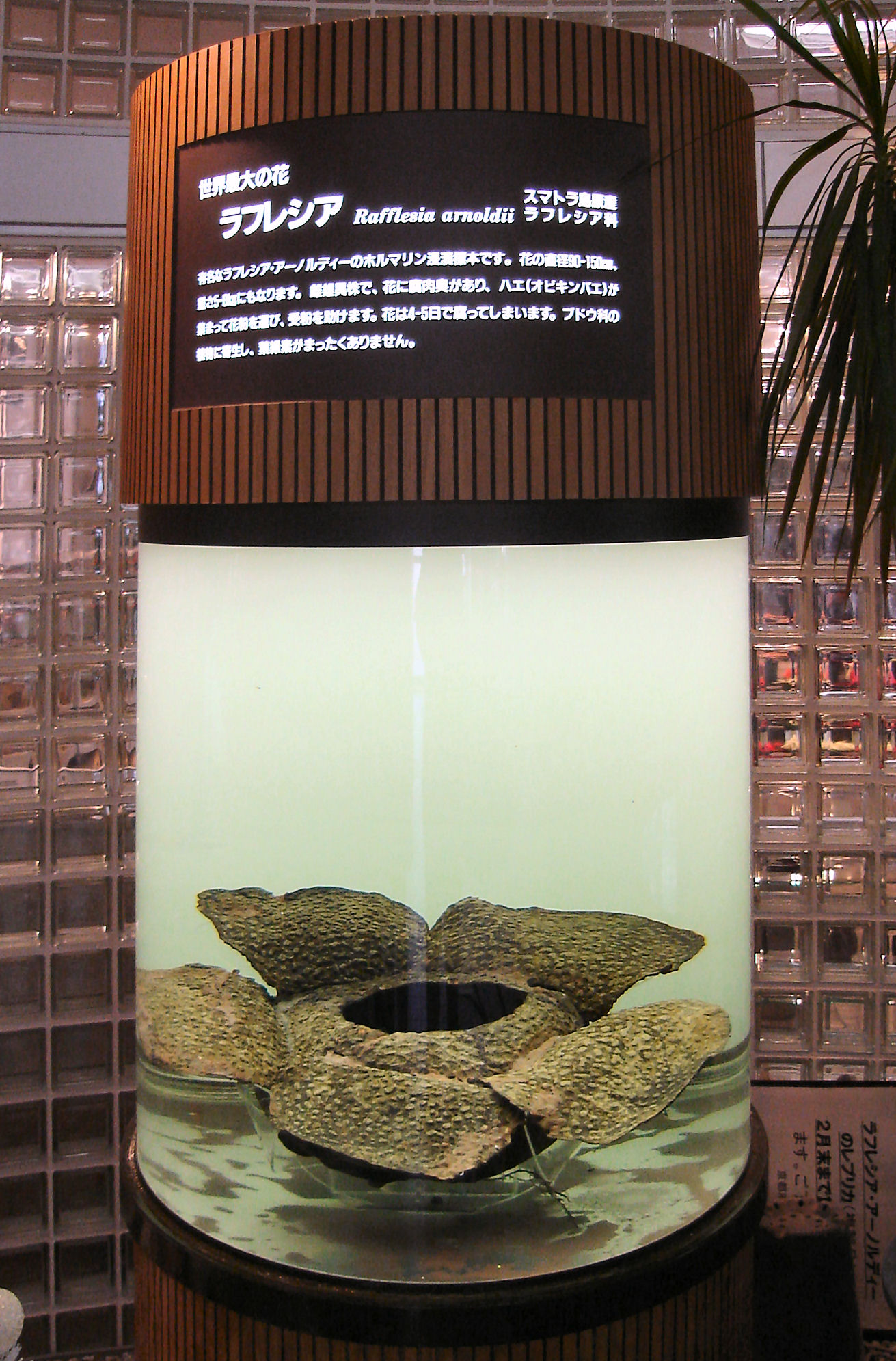
Specimen of Rafflesia arnoldii at the Kyoto Botanical Garden

Because Jack's name has priority, R. arnoldii should technically be a synonym of R. titan, but at least in Britain, it was common at the time to recognise the names introduced by well-regarded scientists such as Brown, over what should taxonomically be the correct name. This was pointed out by the Dutch Rafflesia expert Willem Meijer in his monographic addition to the book series Flora Malesiana in 1997. Instead of sinking R. arnoldii into synonymy, however, he declared that the name R. titan was "incompletely known": the plant material used by Jack to describe the plant has been lost.

In 1999, the British botanical historian David Mabberley, in response to Meijer's findings, attempted to rescue Brown's names from synonymy. This is known as 'conservation' in taxonomy, and normally this requires making a formal proposal to the committee of the International Code of Botanical Nomenclature (ICBN). Mabberley thought he found a loophole around such a formal review by noting that while Brown was notoriously slow to get his papers published, he often had a handful of pre-print pages privately printed to exchange with other botanists: one of these pre-prints had been recently bought by the Hortus Botanicus Leiden, and it was dated April 1821. Mabberley thus proposed that this document be considered the official effective publication, stating this would invalidate Jack's earlier name. For some reason Mabberley uses 1821, a few months after Brown's pre-print, as the date of Jack's publication, instead of the 1820 publication date in Singapore. Confusingly, the record in the International Plant Names Index (IPNI) still has yet another date, "1823?", as it was in the Index Kewensis before Meijer's 1997 work. Mabberley's proposals regarding Brown's name were accepted by institutions, such as the Index Kewensis.

Mabberley also pointed out that the genus Rafflesia was thus first validated by an anonymous report on the meeting published in the Annals of Philosophy in September 1820 (the name was technically an unpublished nomen nudum until this publication). Mabberley claimed the author was Samuel Frederick Gray. However, as that is nowhere stated in the Annals, per Article 46.8 of the code of ICBN, Mabberley was wrong to formally ascribe the validation to Gray. The validation of the name was thus attributed to one Thomas Thomson, the editor of the Annals in 1820, by the IPNI. Mabberley admitted his error in 2017. This Thomson was not the botanist Thomas Thomson, who was three years old in 1820, but his identically named father, a chemist, and Rafflesia is thus the only botanical taxon this man ever published.

== Regional names ==
It is called kerubut in Sumatra. In the kecamatan ('district') of Pandam Gadang, it is known as cendawan biriang in the Minangkabau language.

== Description ==
Although Rafflesia is a vascular plant, it lacks any observable leaves, stems or even roots, and does not have chlorophyll. It lives as a holoparasite on vines of the genus Tetrastigma, most commonly T. angustifolium. Similar to fungi, individuals grow as a mass of thread-like strands of tissue completely embedded within and in intimate contact with surrounding host cells from which nutrients and water are obtained. It can only be seen outside the host plant when it is ready to reproduce; the only part of Rafflesia that is identifiable as distinctly plant-like are the flowers, though even these are unusual since they attain massive proportions, are reddish-brown with white spots, and stink of rotting flesh. According to Sandved, the flower opens with a hissing sound.

The flower of Rafflesia arnoldii grows to a diameter of around 1 m (3 ft 3 in), and weighs up to 11 kg (24 lb). According to the Mongabay institution, the single largest R. arnoldii to be measured was 1.14 m (3 ft 9 in) in width. These flowers emerge from very large, cabbage-like, maroon or dark brown buds typically about 30 cm (12 in) wide, but the largest (and the largest flower bud ever recorded) found at Mount Sago, Sumatra in May 1956 was 43 cm (17 in) in diameter. Indonesian researchers often refer to the bud as a 'knop' (knob).

The plant is native to the rainforest regions of Malaysia, Indonesia, the Philippines, and Thailand.

According to the Guinness Book of World Records, this is the largest singular flower in the world currently known.

== Ecology ==
=== Habitat ===
Rafflesia arnoldii is found in both secondary and primary rainforests.

The only host plant species of R. arnoldii is Tetrastigma leucostaphylum in West Sumatra. Tetrastigma are themselves parasites of a sort, using the strength and upright growth of other surrounding plants to reach the light. The host plants of the host plants – the trees that Tetrastigma uses to climb up to light, are relatively limited in number of species, although they are generally the closest tree to the vine. When it is young, at least at the locations studied in West Sumatra, areas of primary forest, the vine climbs on sapling trees and bushes of Laportea stimulans and Coffea canephora in the undergrowth, in the subcanopy a Campnosperma species is the most important, whereas the only large tree the vine grows in is also Laportea stimulans. Tetrastigma often can completely envelop its host at the subcanopy level, choking out the light to such degree that the forest floor below the canopy is completely dark–this is apparently preferred by Rafflesia arnoldii, as the most knops are found at the darkest locations in the forest. The most common plant associated with Rafflesia arnoldii is the smallish tree Coffea canephora (the well-known robusta coffee), which is actually not native to the area, but was introduced from Africa. It covers most of the undergrowth, with an Importance Value Index (IVI) of over 100%, and is also the main component of the subcanopy with an IVI of 52.74%. The dominant tall tree in these areas is Toona sureni, which has a canopy IVI of 4.97%.

Other important components of the ecosystem around Rafflesia arnoldii plants at this location are, in the undergrowth, the Urticaceae Laportea stimulans (IVI: 55.81%) and Villebrunea rubescens (IVI: 50.10%), as well as the wild cinnamon Cinnamomum burmannii (IVI: 24.33%) and the fig Ficus disticha (IVI: 23.83%). In the subcanopy the main plants are Toona sureni (IVI: 34.11%), Laportea stimulans (IVI: 24.62%), Cinnamomum burmannii (IVI: 18.45%) and Ficus ampelos (IVI: 14.53%). The main trees found in the canopy are, besides the Toona, a Shorea species (IVI: 26.24%), Aglaia argentea (IVI: 25.94%), Ficus fistulosa (IVI: 16.08%) and Macaranga gigantea (IVI: 13.06%).

Rafflesia arnoldii has been found to infect hosts growing in alkaline, neutral and acidic soils. It is not found far from water. It has been found at altitudes from 490–1,024 m.

=== Reproduction ===
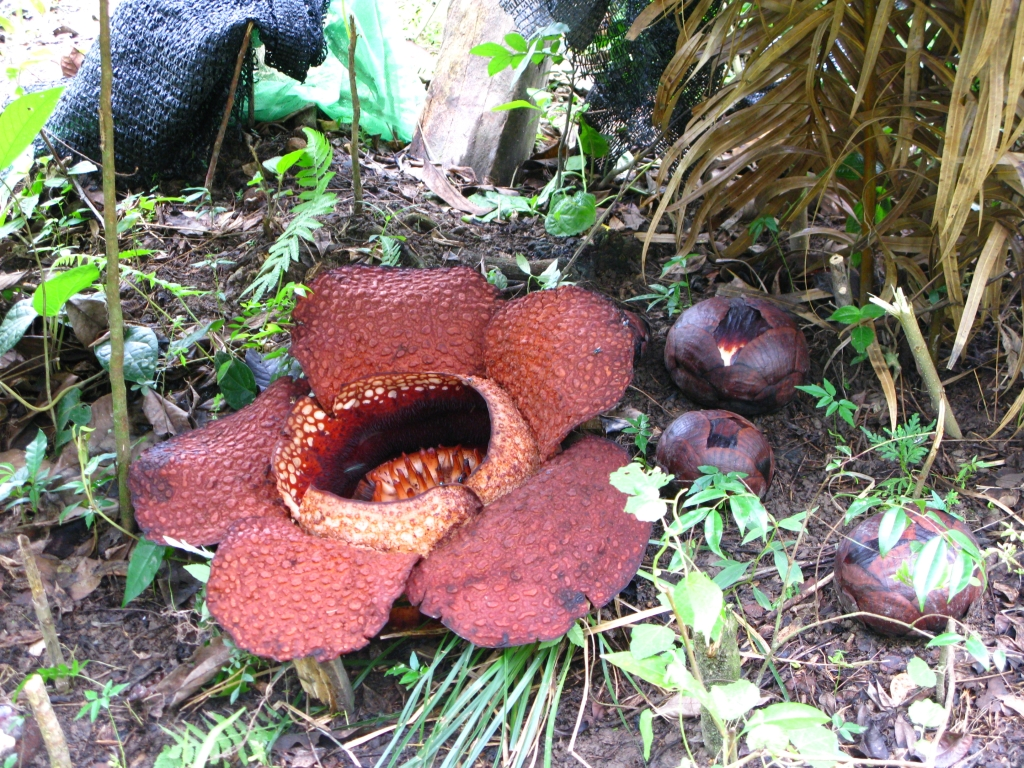
Mature Rafflesia arnoldii flower with buds

The buds take many months to develop and the flower lasts for just a few days. The flowers are dioecious – either male or female, thus both flowers are needed for successful pollination.

When Rafflesia is ready to reproduce, a tiny bud forms outside the root or stem of its host and develops over a period of a year. The cabbage-like head that develops eventually opens to reveal the flower. The stigmas or stamens are attached to a spiked disk inside the flower. A foul smell of rotting meat attracts flies and beetles. The strong odor of decaying flesh produced by Rafflesia arnoldii is a key adaptation for attracting its pollinators. Chemical studies have shown that this scent is caused by sulfur-containing compounds such as dimethyl disulfide and dimethyl trisulfide, which are also present in decomposing organic matter. These compounds attract carrion flies (family Calliphoridae), which serve as the plant’s primary pollinators. The flies are deceived by the odor and coloration of the flower, mistaking it for decaying meat, and in the process transfer pollen between blooms. This highly specialized pollination strategy helps ensure reproduction in the dense rainforests of Sumatra and Borneo. To pollinate successfully, the flies and/or beetles must visit both the male and female plants, in that order. The fruit produced are round berries filled with numerous minute seeds.

The flies Drosophila colorata, Chrysomya megacephala and Sarcophaga haemorrhoidalis visit the late flowers. Black ants of the genus Euprenolepis may feed on the developing flower buds, perhaps killing them.

== Conservation ==
It has not been assessed for the IUCN Red List, but the conservation status of the Rafflesia arnoldii is currently of concern due to anthropogenic and biological factors. Anthropogenic factors contributing to the decline are primarily deforestation and harvesting; biological factors contributing to the decline include the plant's dioecious nature, limited population, and skewed sex ratio, with the majority of the flowers being male. However, ecotourism is thought to be a main threat to the species. At locations which are regularly visited by tourists the number of flower buds produced per year has decreased.

== See also ==
- Largest organisms
- TED talk: Life history of Rafflesia arnoldii (Daniel L. Nickrent, February 2024)
