= List of Indonesian floral emblems =

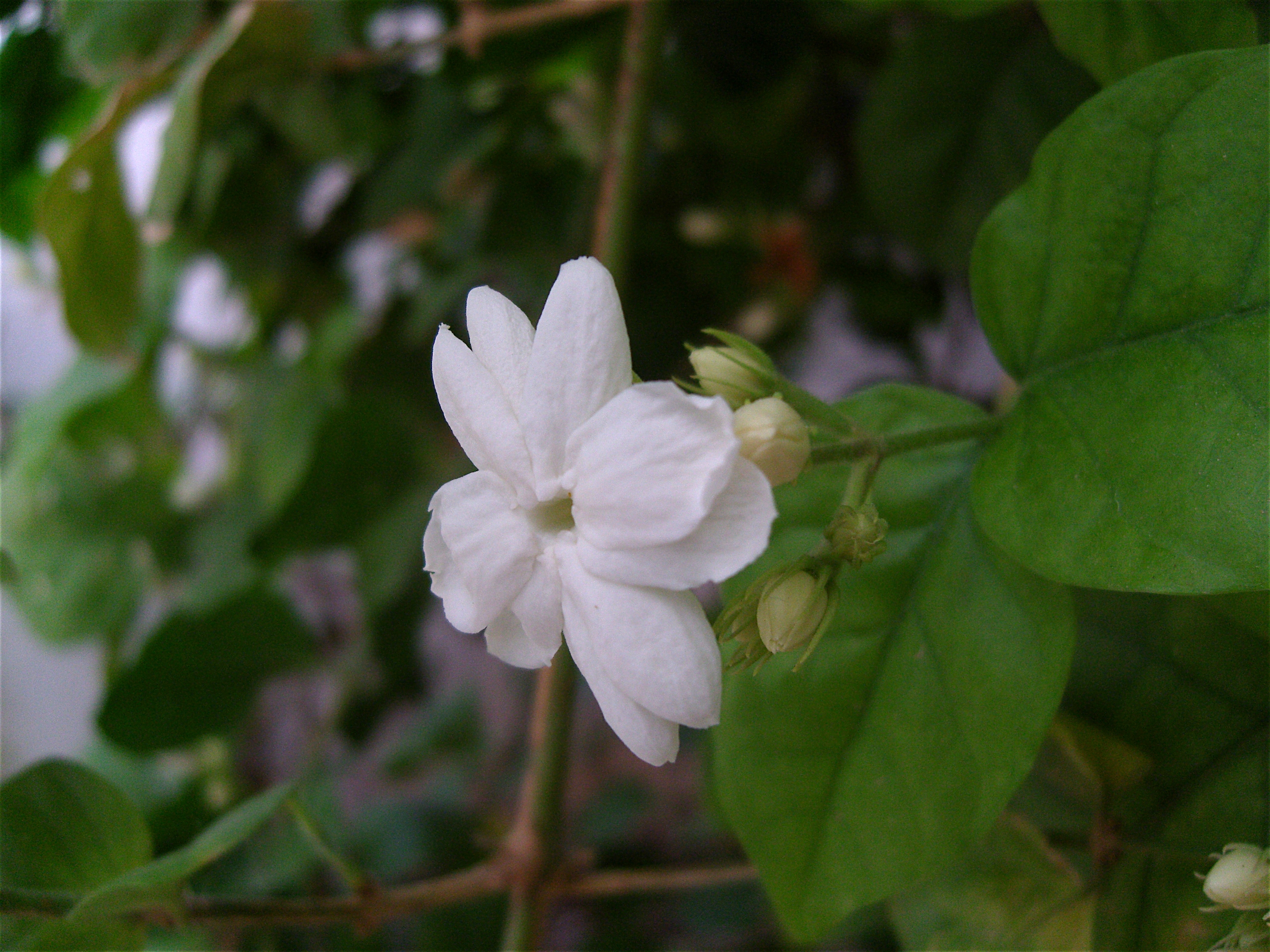
Jasminum sambac, the national flower of Indonesia

Indonesian floral emblems are Indonesian endemic flora that gain the status as national animal symbol that represent Indonesia and describe Indonesian biodiversity. Next to national floral symbols, there are also more specific provincial floral emblems that represent each respective provinces of Indonesia.

In addition, Indonesia also recognised Teak as the national tree.

== Indonesian national floral emblems ==
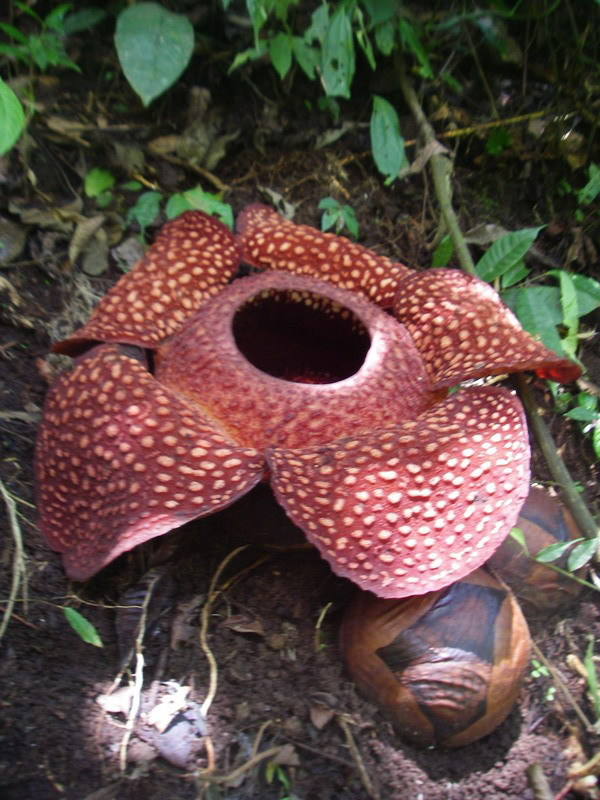
Rafflesia arnoldii in Sumatra

There are three categories of floral emblem that symbolise Indonesia:

1. National flower (Indonesian: Puspa bangsa) of Indonesia is Melati putih (Jasminum sambac)
2. Flower of charm (Indonesian: Puspa pesona) is Anggrek Bulan (Moon Orchid) (Phalaenopsis amabilis))
3. Rare flower (Indonesian: Puspa langka) is Padma Raksasa Rafflesia (Rafflesia arnoldii). All three were chosen on World Environment Day in 1990. On the other occasion Bunga Bangkai (Titan arum) was also added as puspa langka together with Rafflesia.

Melati putih (jasminum sambac), a small white flower with sweet fragrance, has long been considered as a sacred flower in Indonesian tradition, as it symbolises purity, sacredness, graceful simplicity and sincerity. Although the official adoption were announced only as early as 1990 during World Environment Day and enforced by law through Presidential Decree (Keputusan Presiden) No. 4 1993, the importance of Jasminum sambac in Indonesian culture predates its official adoption. Since the formation of Indonesian republic during the reign of Sukarno, melati putih is always unofficially recognised as the national flower of Indonesia. The reverence and the elevated status of this flower mostly due to the importance of jasminum sambac in Indonesian tradition since ancient times.

Melati putih is also the most important flower in wedding ceremonies for ethnic Indonesians, especially in the island of Java. Jasmine flower buds that haven't fully opened are usually picked to create strings of jasmine garlands called roncen melati. On wedding days, a traditional Javanese or Sundanese bride's hair is adorned with strings of jasmine garlands arranged as a hairnet to cover the konde (hair bun). The intricately intertwined strings of jasmine garlands are left to hang loose from the bride's head. The groom's kris is also adorned with five jasmine garlands called roncen usus-usus (intestine garlands) to refer its intestine-like form and also linked to the legend of Arya Penangsang. In Makassar and Bugis brides, the hair is also adorned with buds of jasmine that resemble pearls. Jasmine is also used as floral offerings for spirits and deities especially among Balinese Hindu, and also often present during funerals.

The jasmine has wide spectrums in Indonesian traditions; it is the flower of life, beauty and festive wedding, yet it is also often associated with spirit and death. In Indonesian patriotic songs and poems, the fallen melati often hailed as the representation of fallen heroes that sacrificed their life for the country. The Ismail Marzuki's patriotic song "Melati di Tapal Batas" (jasmine on the border) (1947) and Guruh Sukarnoputra's "Melati Suci" (sacred jasmine) (1974) clearly refer jasmine as the representation of fallen heroes, the eternally fragrance flower that adorned Ibu Pertiwi (Indonesian national personification).

The other two national flowers were chosen for different reasons. Moon Orchid was chosen for its beauty, while the other two rare flowers, Rafflesia arnoldii and Titan arum were chosen to demonstrate uniqueness and Indonesian floral biodiversity.

== Indonesian provinces floral emblems ==
Each of the 34 provinces of Indonesia also have native plants used as floral emblems. This is a list of Indonesian floral emblems representing the provinces.

- Aceh - Bunga Jeumpa (Magnolia champaca)
- North Sumatra - Kenanga (Cananga odorata)
- West Sumatra - Pohon Andalas (Morus macroura)
- Riau - Nibung (Oncosperma tigillarium)
- Riau islands - Sirih (Piper betle)
- Jambi - Pinang Merah (Cyrtostachys renda)
- South Sumatra - Duku (Lansium parasiticum)
- Bengkulu - Suweg Raksasa (Amorphophallus titanum)
- Bangka Belitung - Nagasari (Palaquium rostratum)
- Lampung - Bunga Ashar (Mirabilis jalapa)
- Banten - Kokoleceran (Vatica bantamensis)
- DKI Jakarta - Salak Condet (Salacca edulis)
- West Java - Gandaria (Bouea macrophylla)
- Central Java - Kantil (Magnolia x alba)
- Yogyakarta Special Region - Kepel (Stelechocarpus burahol)
- East Java - Sedap Malam (Agave amica, syn. Polianthes tuberosa)
- West Kalimantan - Tengkawang Tungkul (Shorea stenoptera, now Rubroshorea stenoptera)
- South Kalimantan - Kasturi (Mangifera casturi)
- Central Kalimantan - Tenggaring (Nephelium lappaceum)
- East Kalimantan - Anggrek Hitam (Coelogyne pandurata)
- North Kalimantan - Anggrek Hitam (Coelogyne pandurata)
- North Sulawesi - Longusei (Ficus minahasae)
- Gorontalo - Gofasa, Gupasa (Vitex cofassus)
- Central Sulawesi - Eboni (Diospyros celebica)
- South East Sulawesi - Anggrek Serat (Dendrobium utile)
- West Sulawesi - Cempaka hutan kasar (Elmerrillia ovalis)
- South Sulawesi - Lontar (Borassus flabellifer)
- Bali - Majegau (Epicharis densiflora)
- West Nusa Tenggara - Ajan Kelicung (Diospyros macrophylla)
- East Nusa Tenggara - Cendana (Santalum album)
- Maluku - Anggrek Larat (Dendrobium phalaenopsis)
- North Maluku - Cengkeh (Syzygium aromaticum)
- West Papua - Matoa (Pometia pinnata)
- Papua - Buah merah (Pandanus conoideus)
- Ex-province Timor Timur (Timor Leste) - Ampupu (Eucalyptus urophylla)

== See also ==
- List of Indonesian animal emblems
