= List of Indonesian faunal emblems =

Indonesian faunal emblems are Indonesian endemic fauna that gain the status as national animal symbol that represent Indonesia and describe Indonesian biodiversity. Today there are three animals that gained the status as Indonesian faunal emblems: Komodo dragon, Javan hawk-eagle and Asian arowana. Next to national animal symbols, there are also more specific provincial faunal emblems that represent each respective provinces of Indonesia.

== Indonesian national faunal emblems ==
Komodo is an Indonesian endemic animal found only in Komodo, Padar and Rinca island within Komodo National Park. The surviving largest lizard on earth is easily recognised as Indonesian national animal. Komodo also becomes the emblem of East Nusa Tenggara province.

Elang Jawa or Javan hawk-eagle (Nisaetus bartelsi) an endangered raptor endemic to the mountainous forest regions of Java. The Javan hawk-eagle was chosen because its resemblance to the Garuda Pancasila, the most obvious physical traits is the prominent crest crowning its head and the plumage coloured dark-brownish to chestnut-gold. By Presidential decree, the Javan hawk-eagle was legally registered as considered as the national bird of Indonesia, and thus attributing the endangered species very high protection.

Arwana merah (red Asian arowana) is designated as the Indonesian national animal of charm and also national fish. Native to rivers of Sumatra and Indonesian Borneo, Asian arowana is highly adapted to freshwater and usually inhabits blackwater rivers, forested swamps and wetlands. Besides red, Asian arowana has other colour varieties (for example; green, silver and golden) which only can be found in specific geographic regions in Sumatra and Kalimantan.

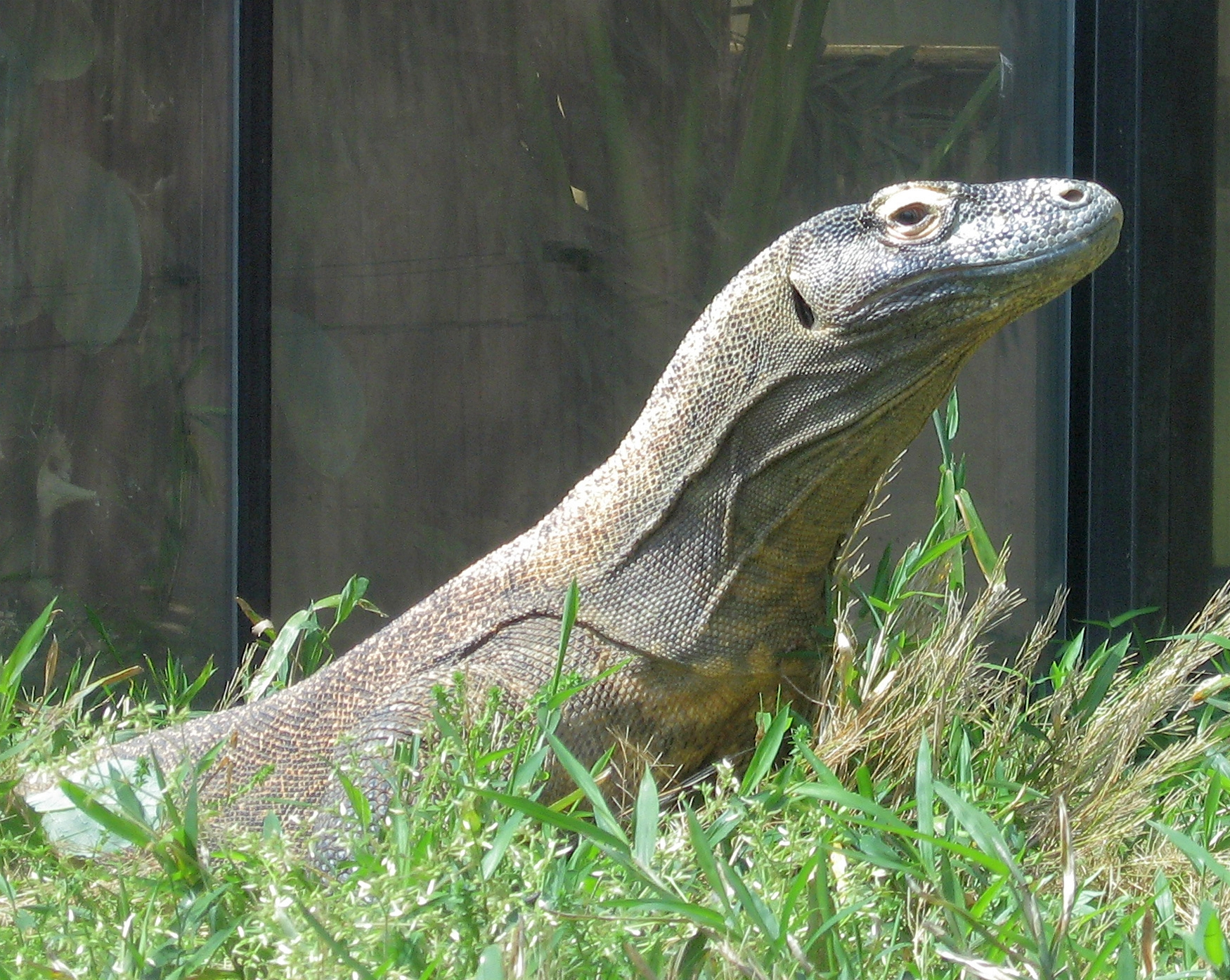
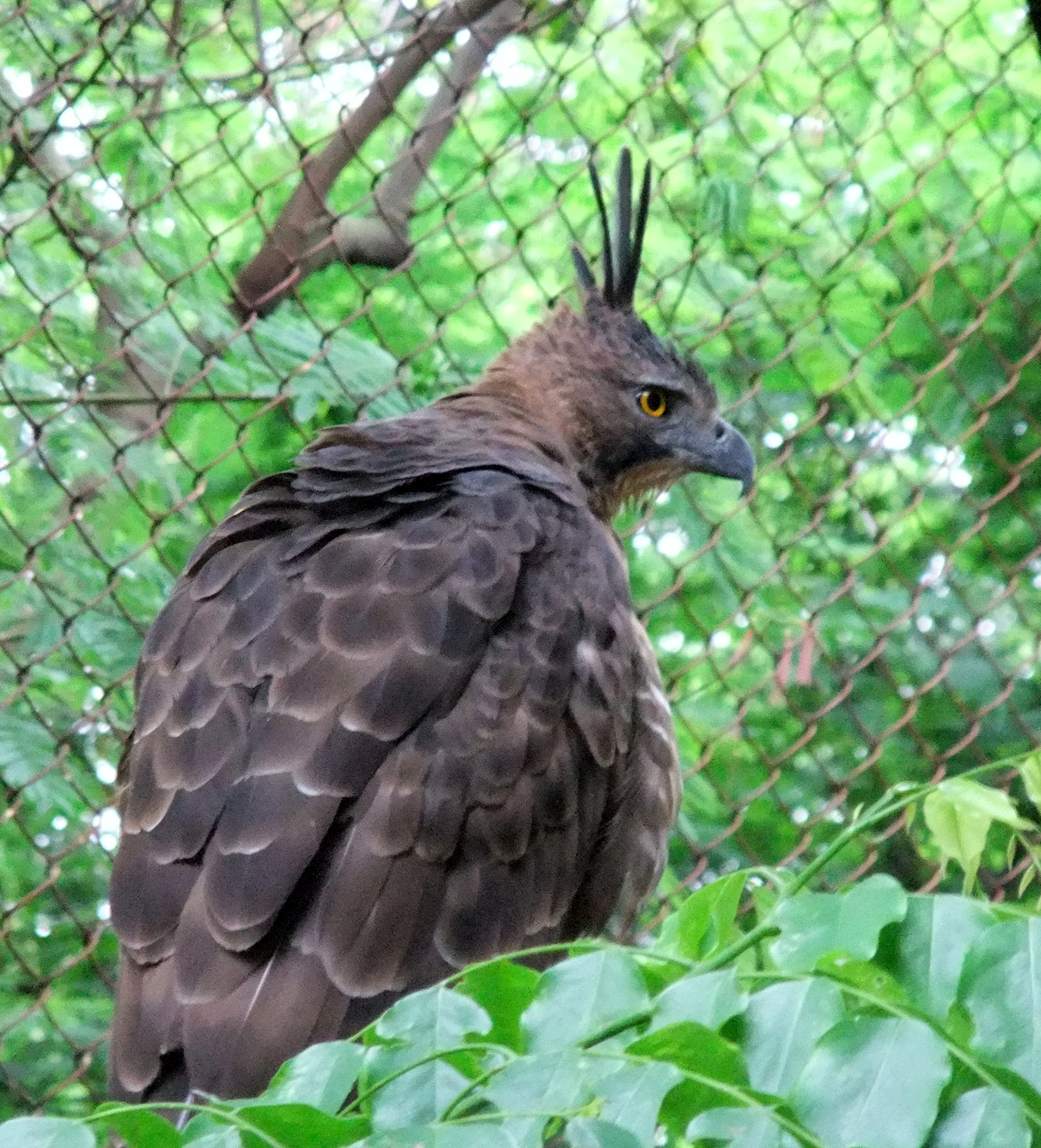
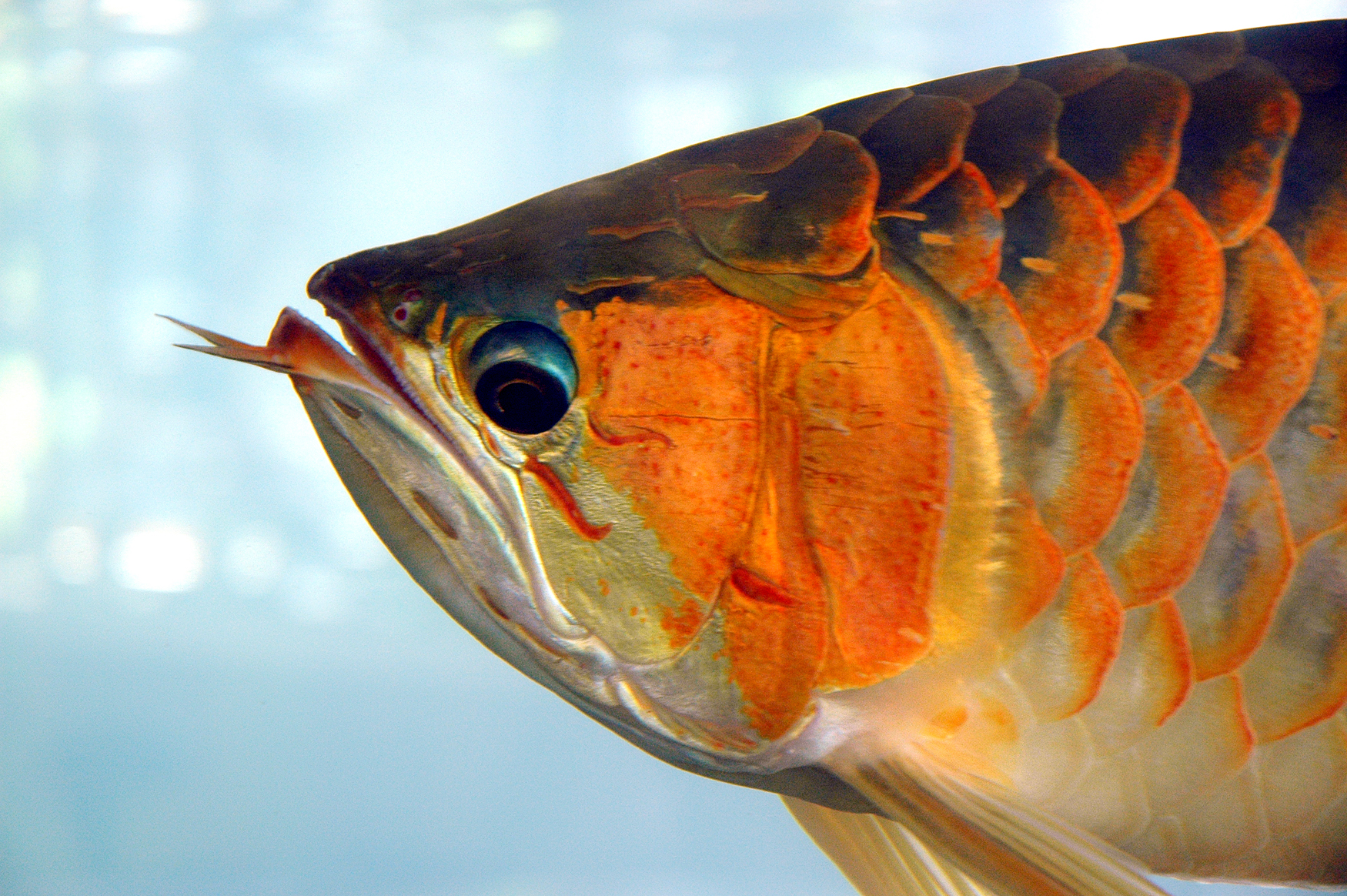
Status	Animal name	Image
National animal	Komodo dragon
National rare animal also national bird	Javan hawk-eagle
National animal of charm also national fish	Asian arowana

== Indonesian provincial faunal emblems ==
Each of 34 Provinces of Indonesia have their own faunal emblems that represents their provinces. The faunal emblems are:

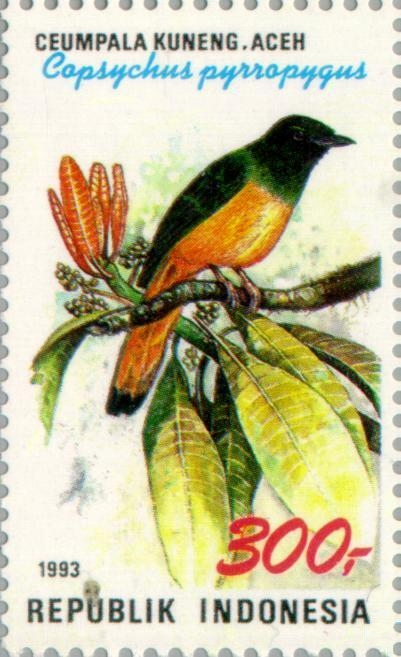
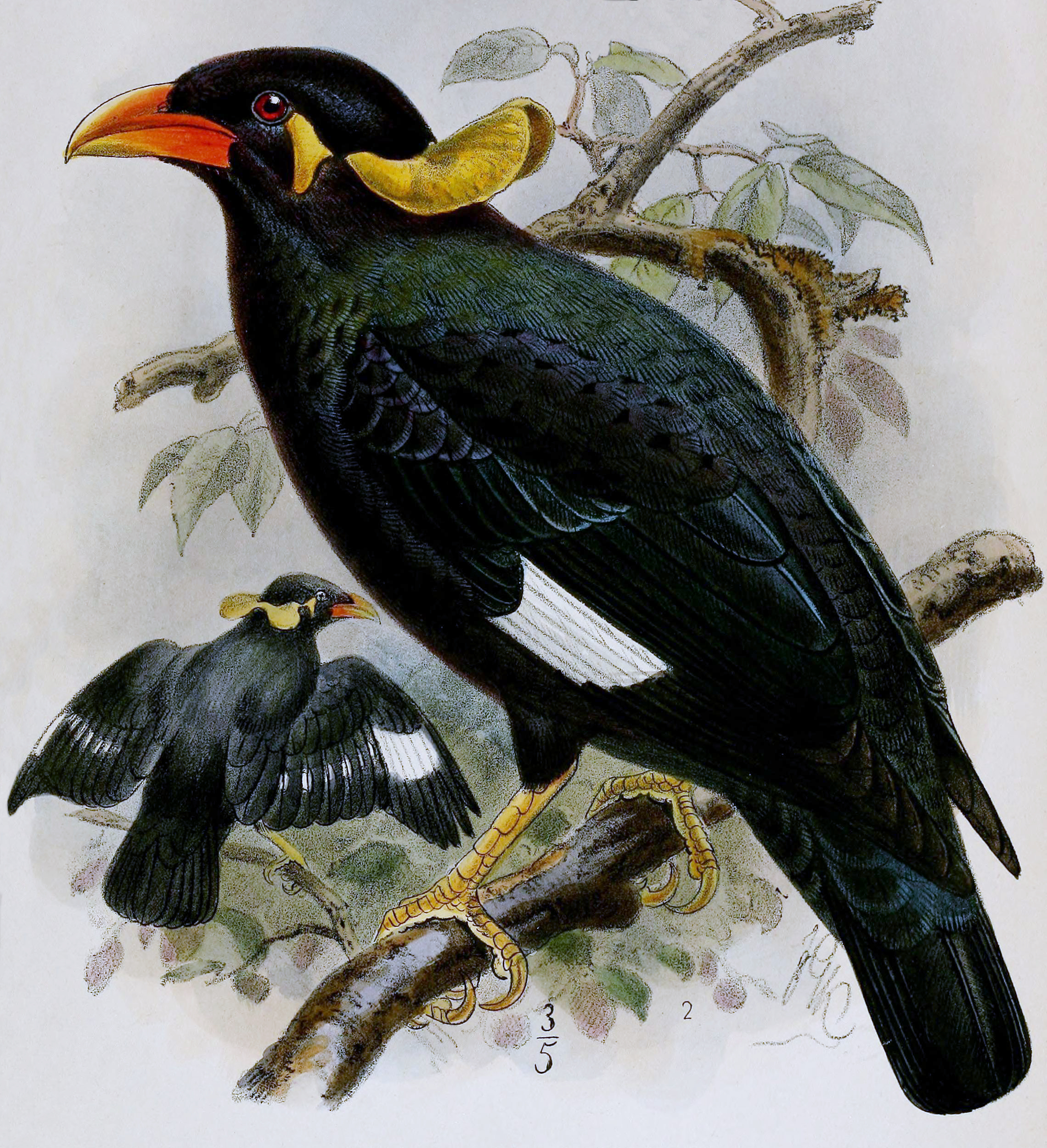
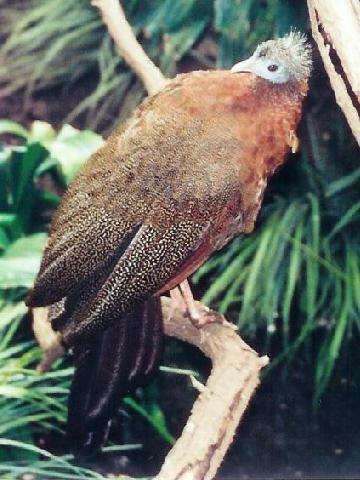
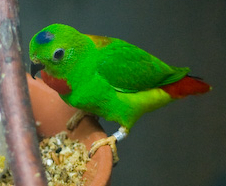
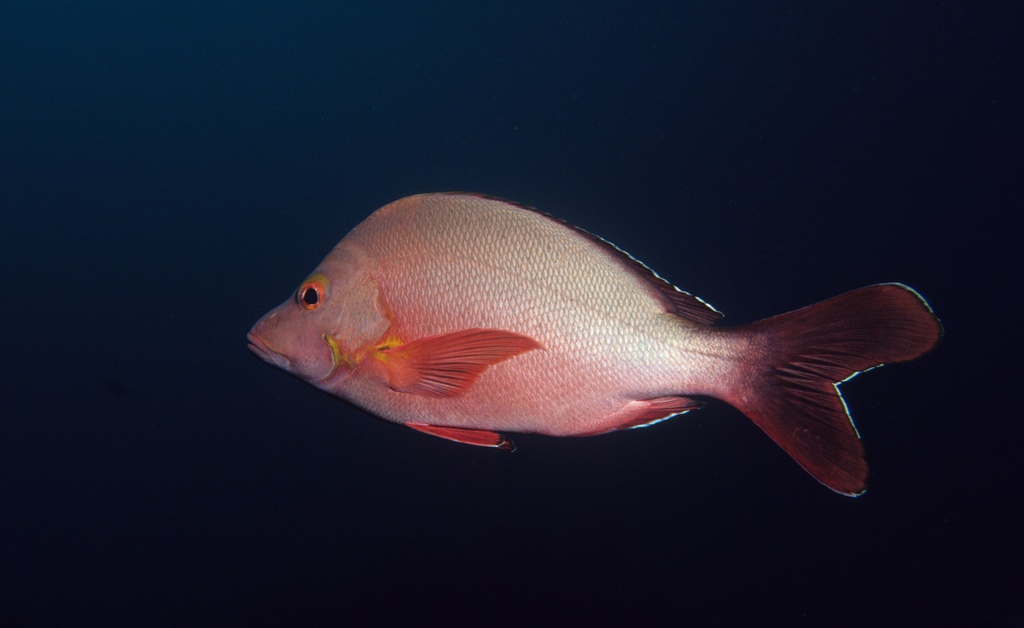
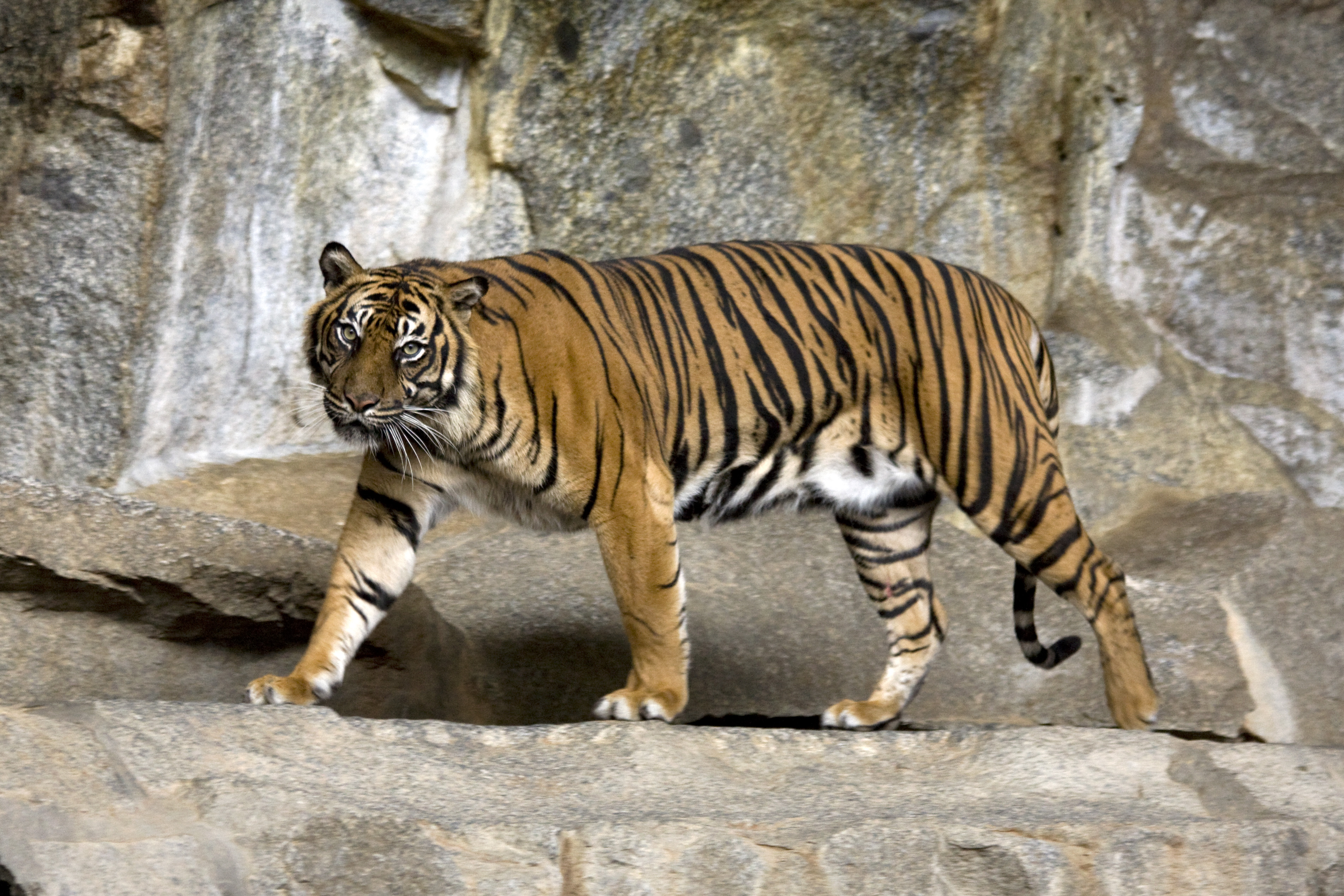
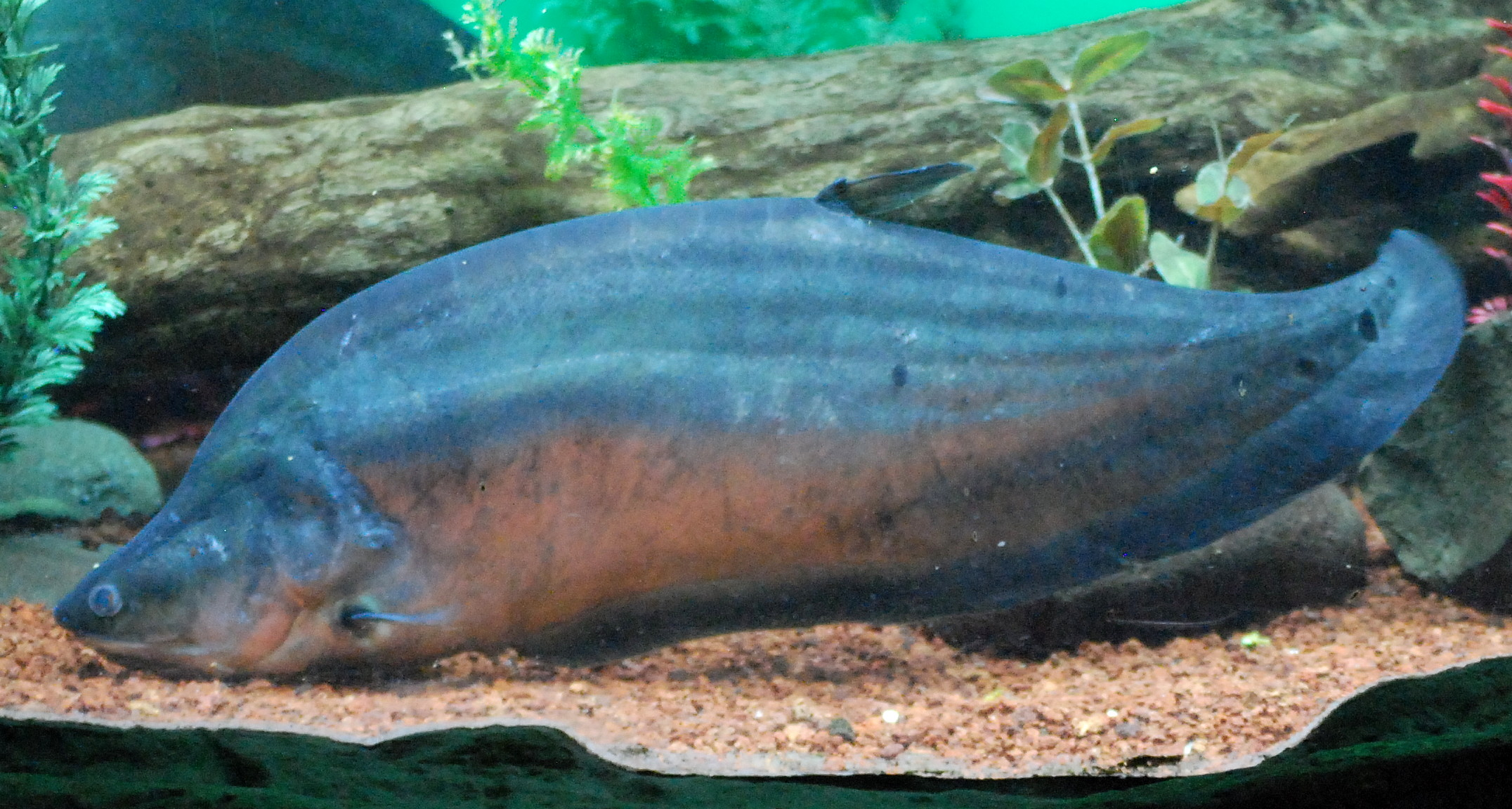
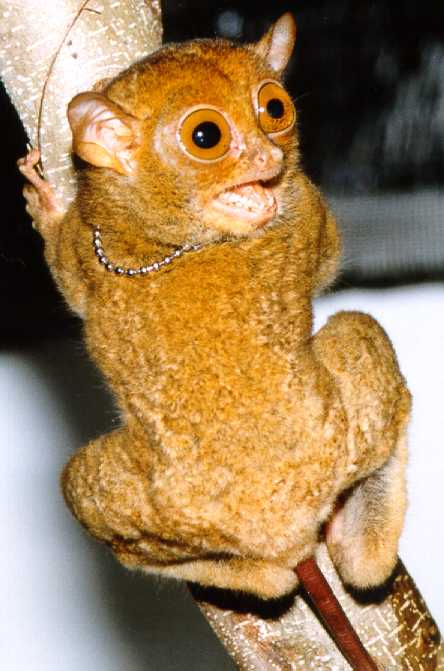
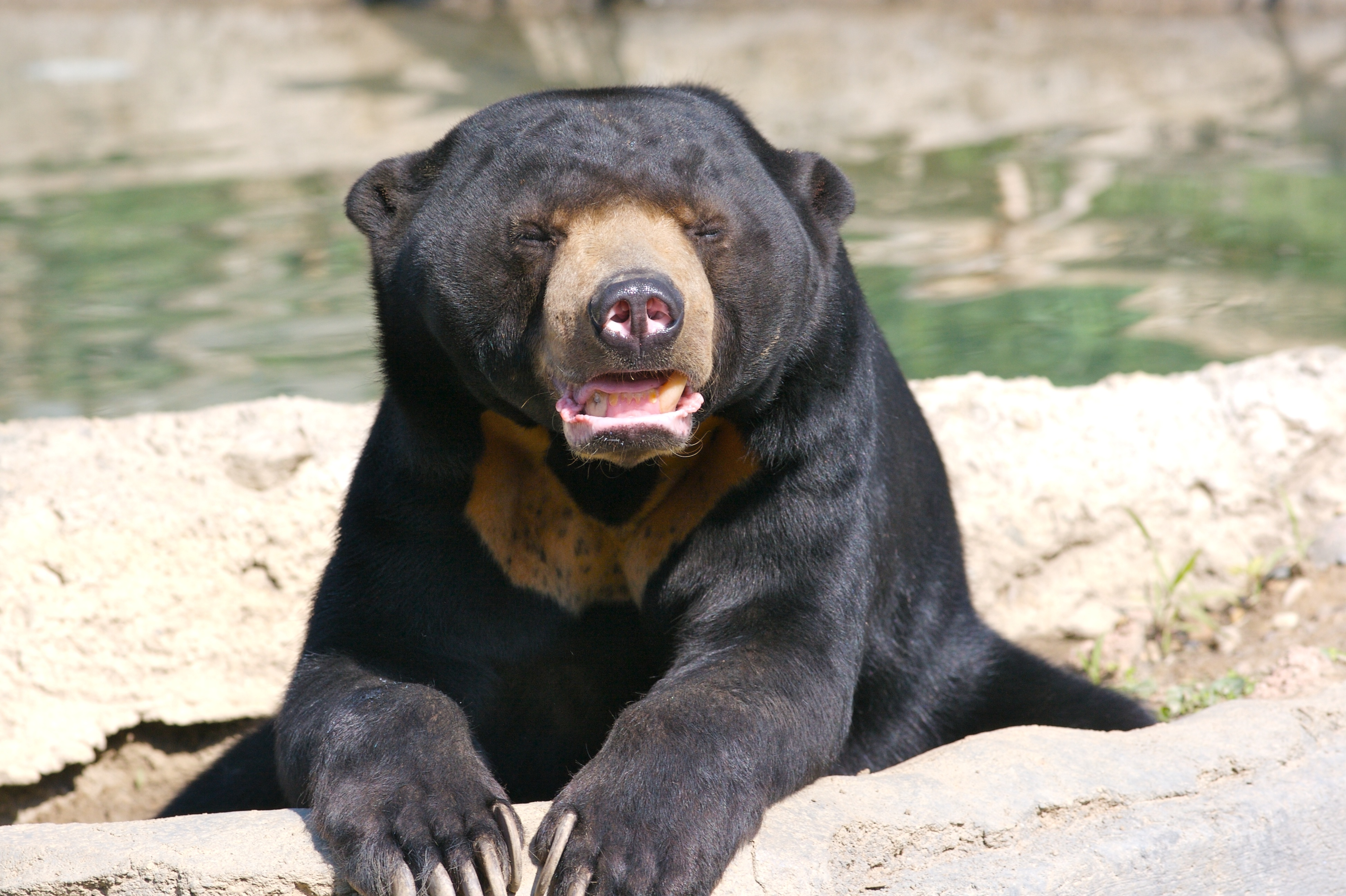
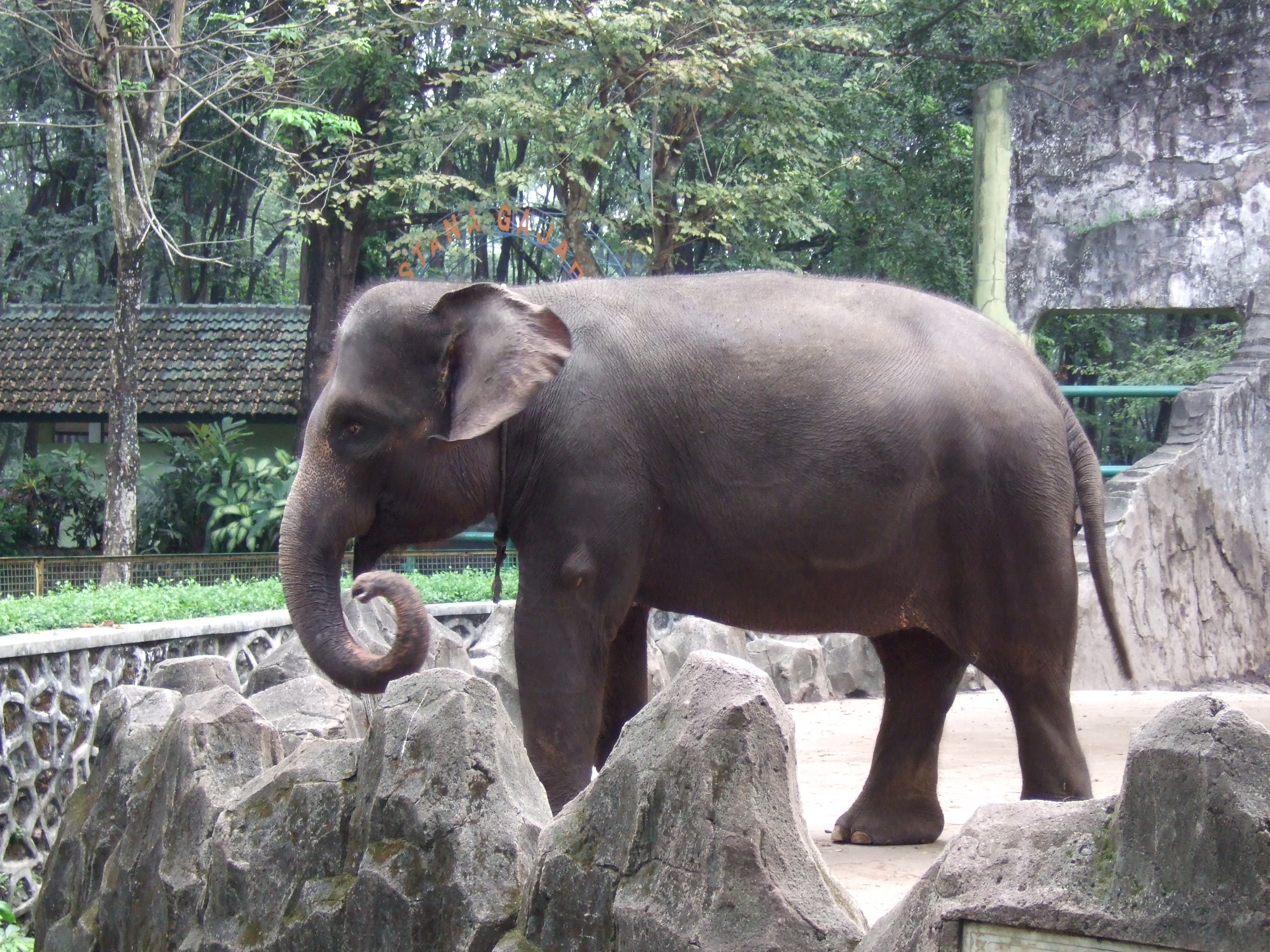
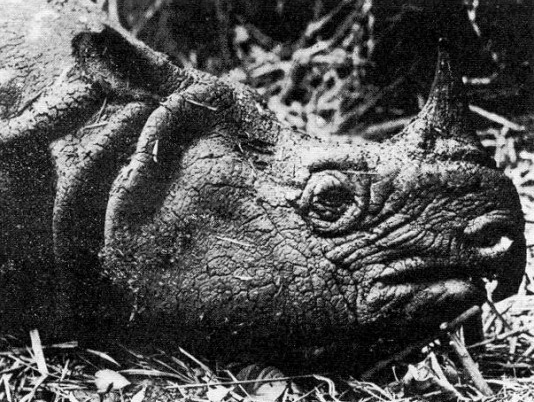
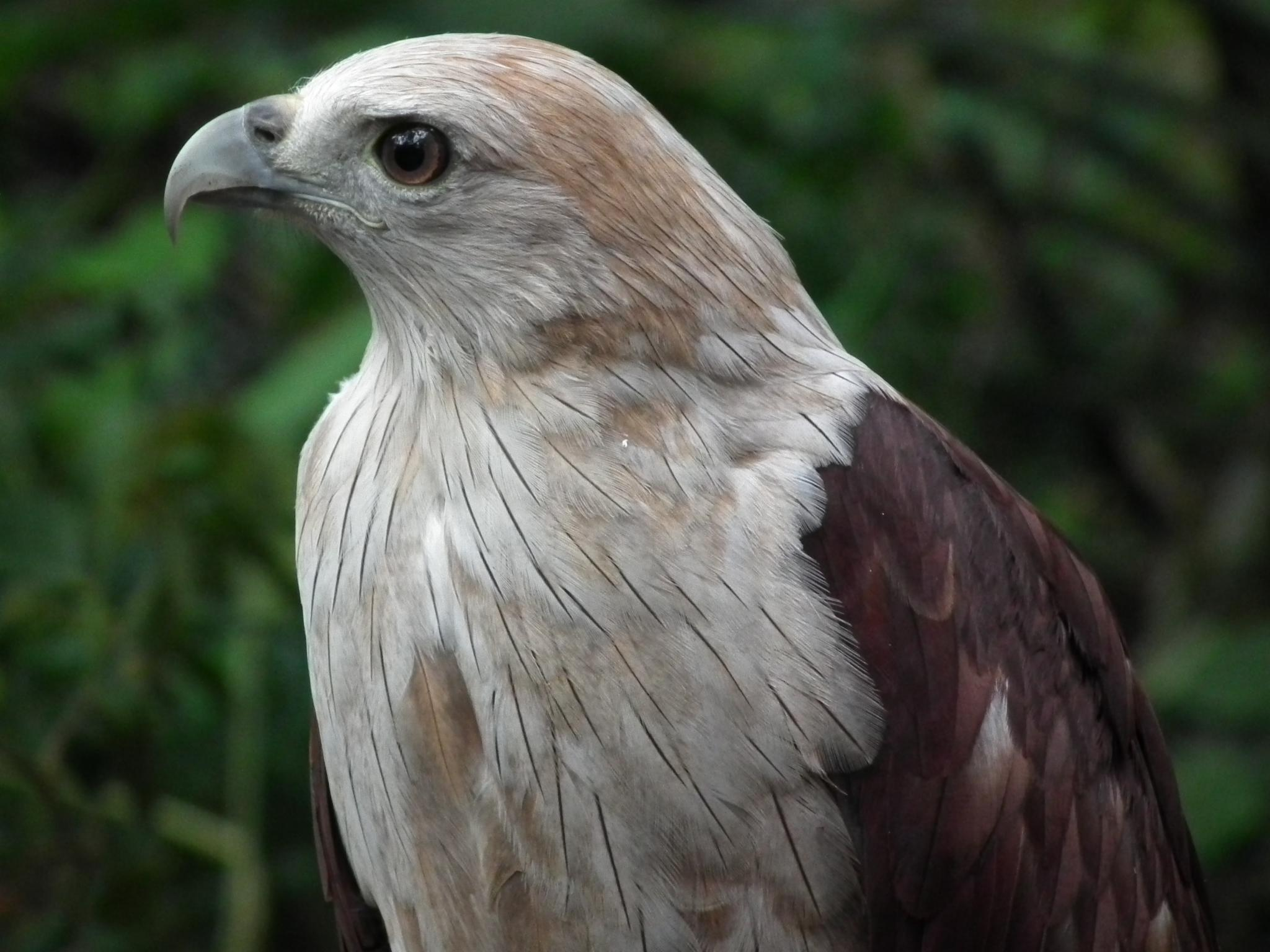
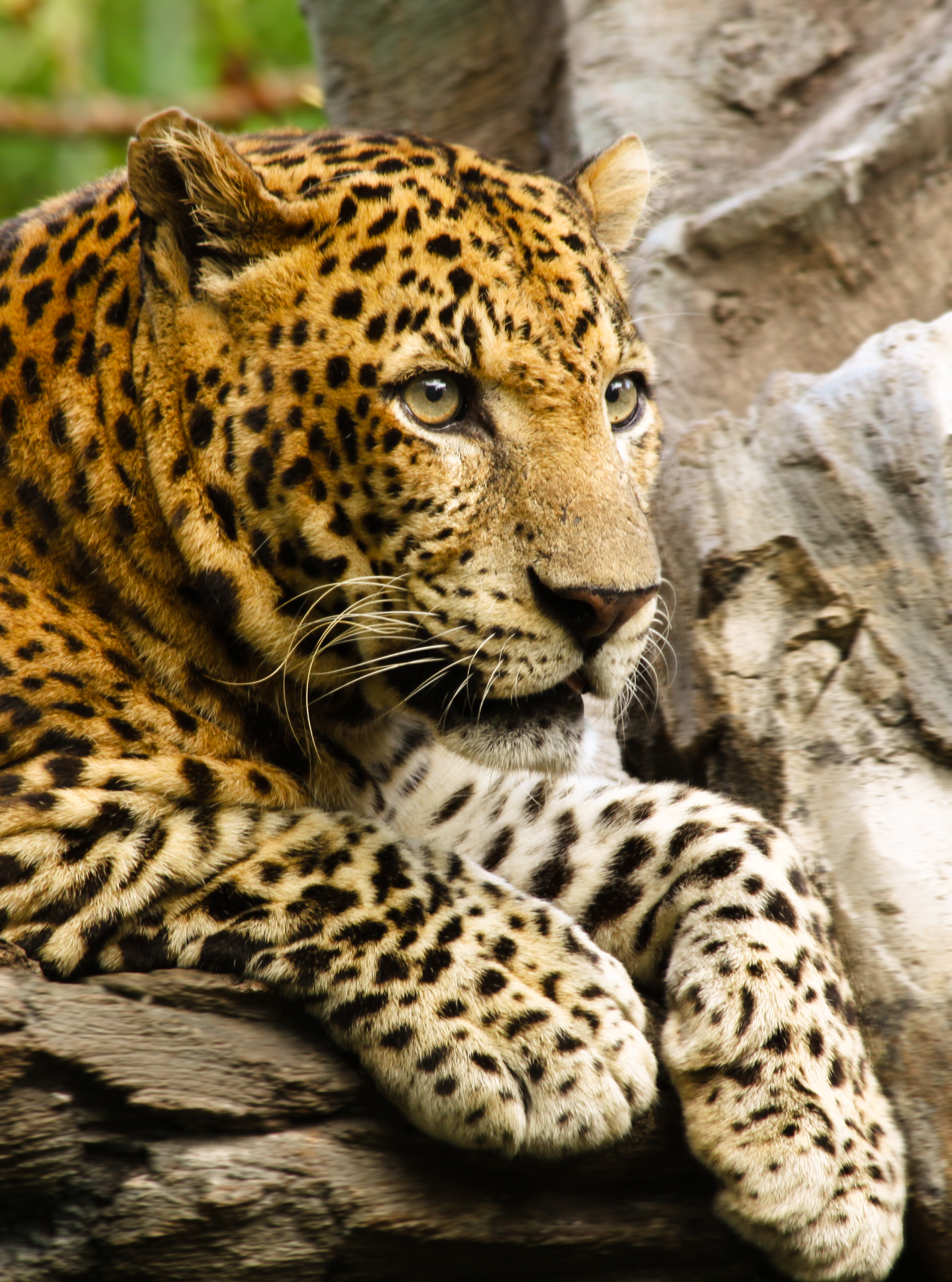
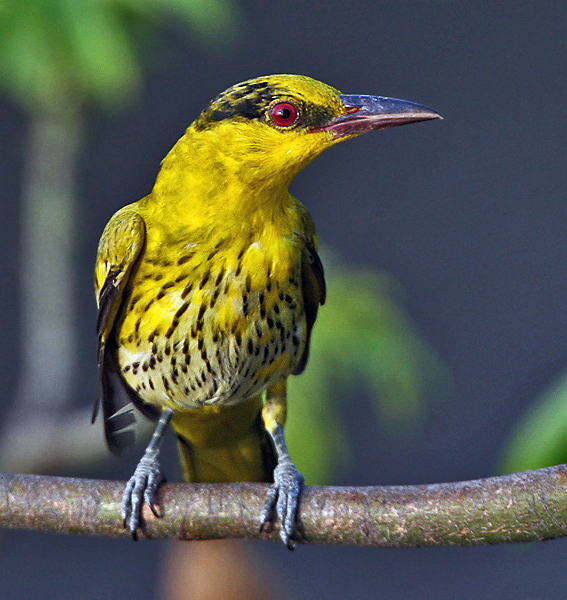
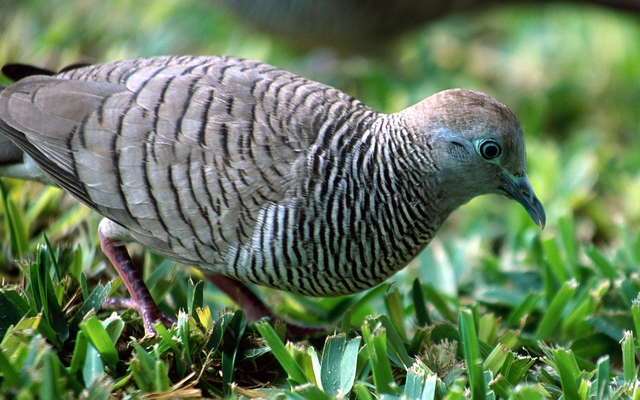
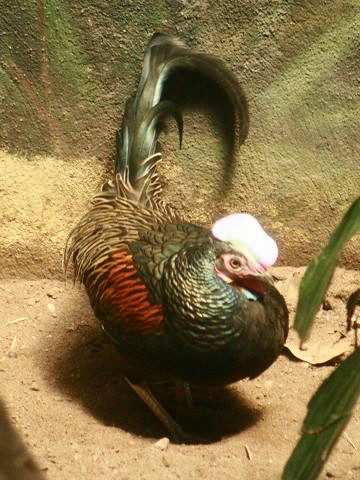
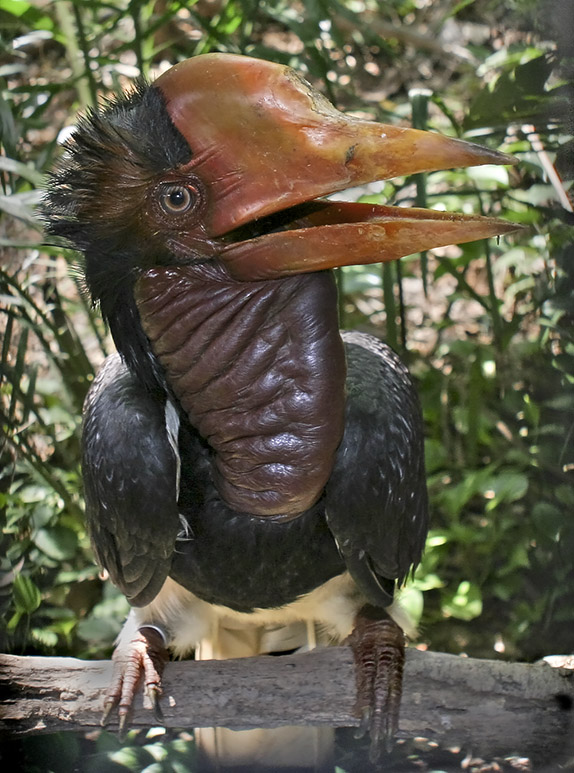
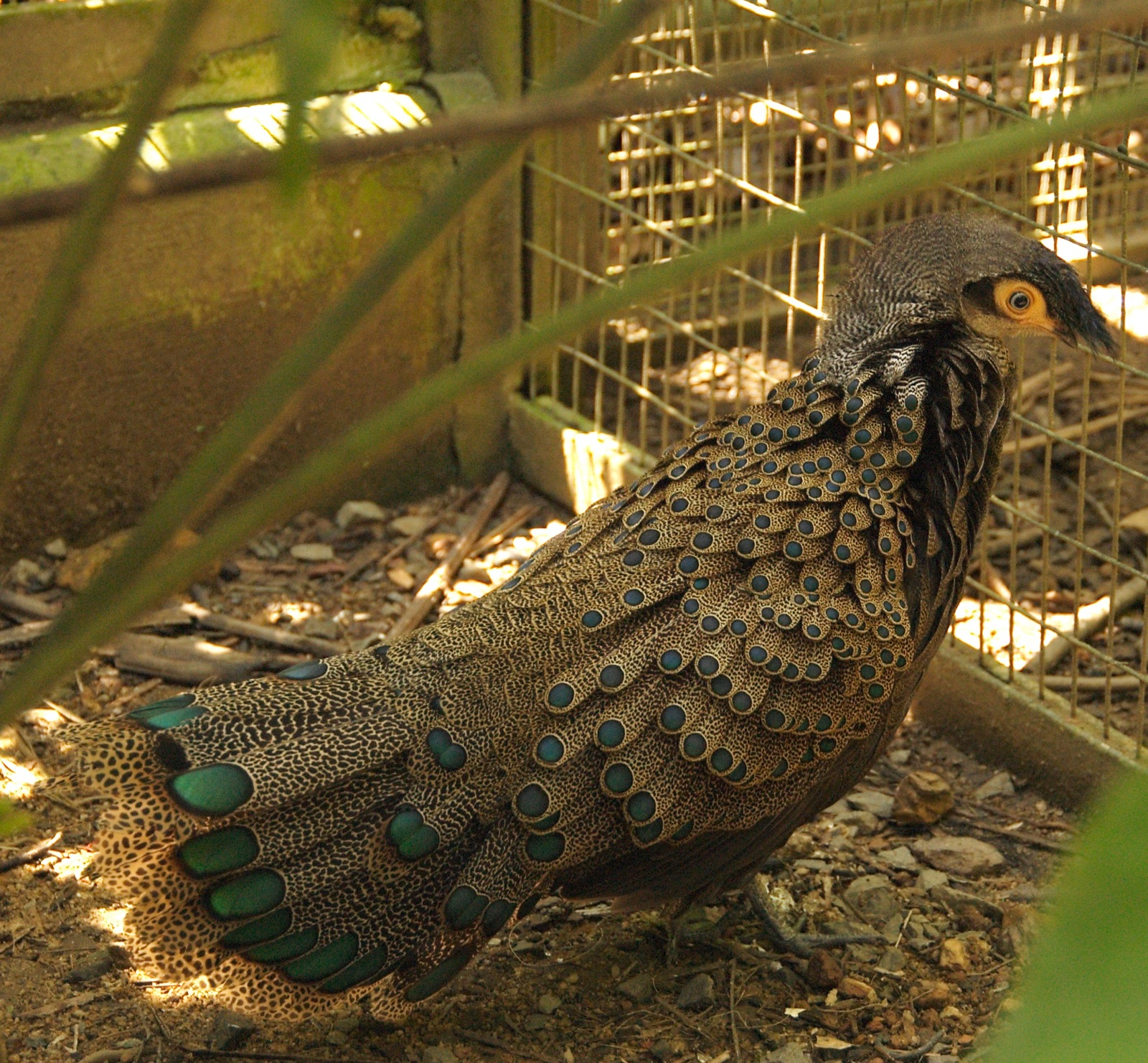
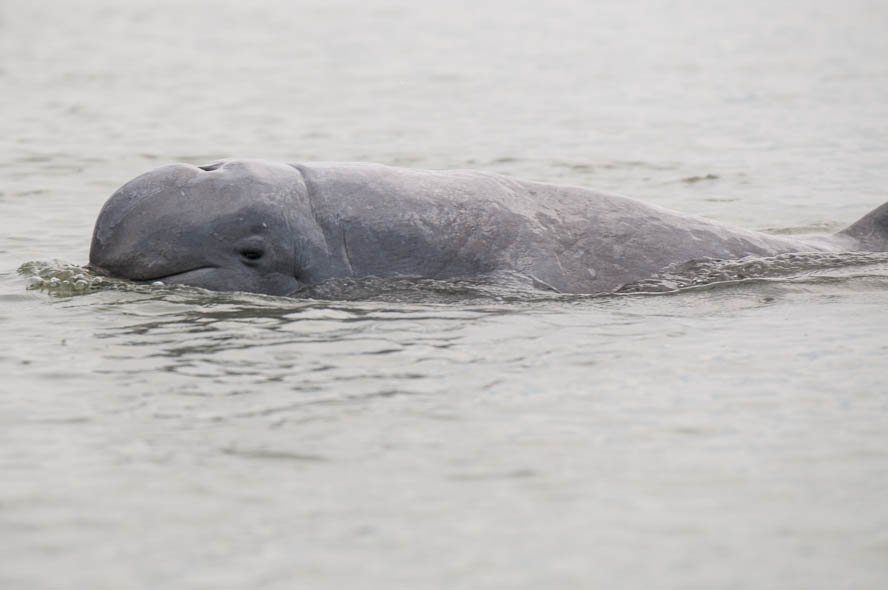
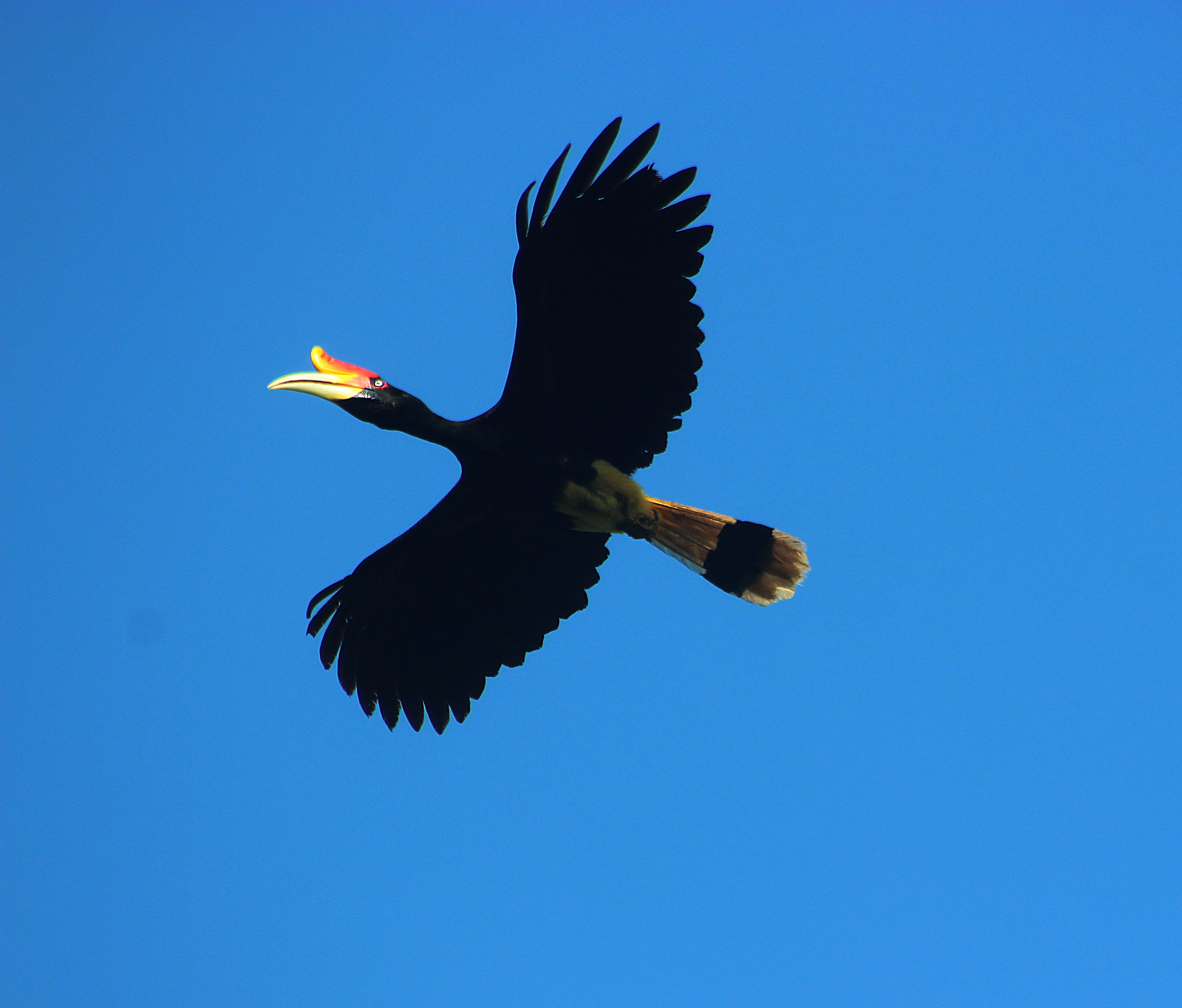
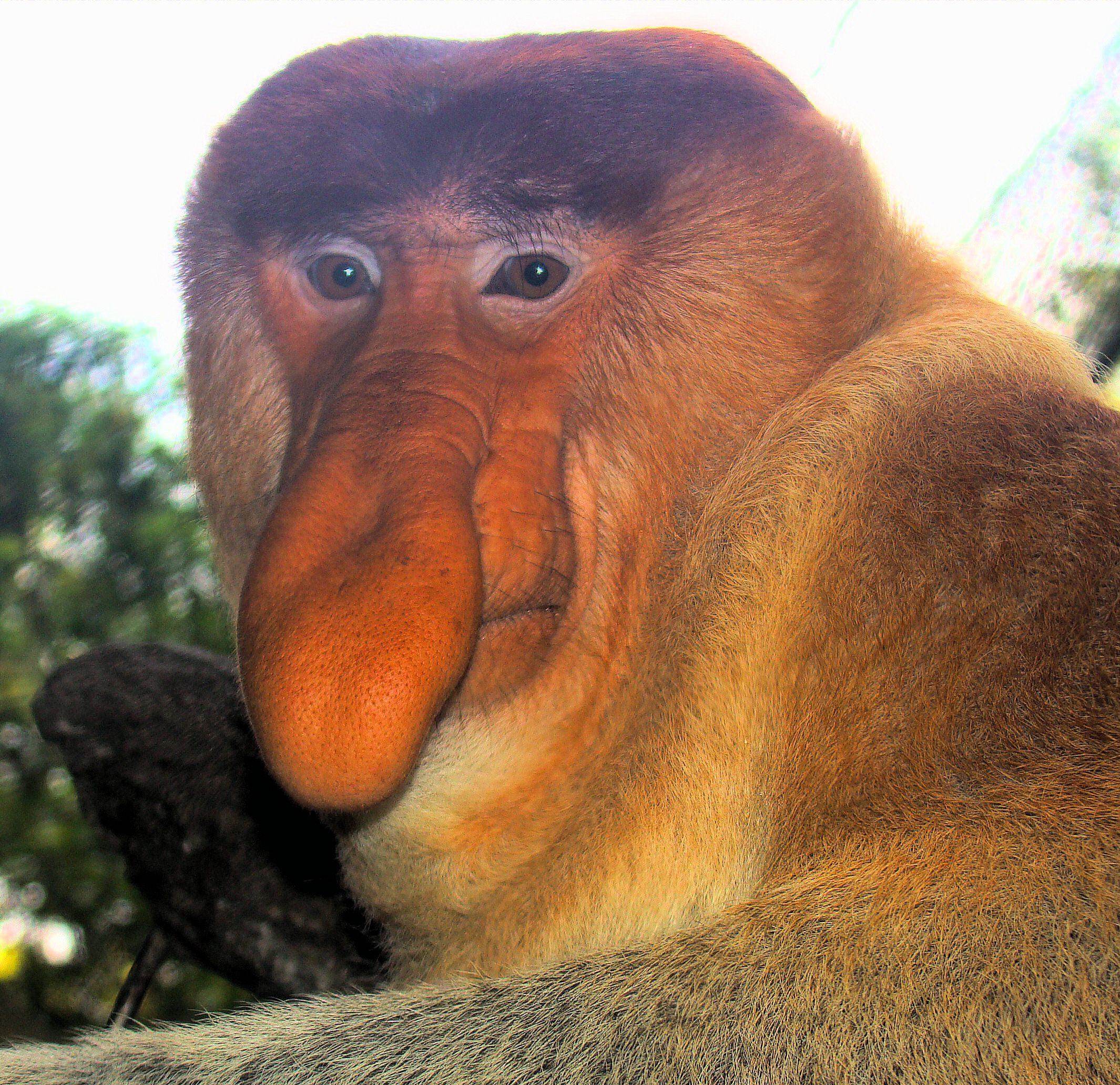
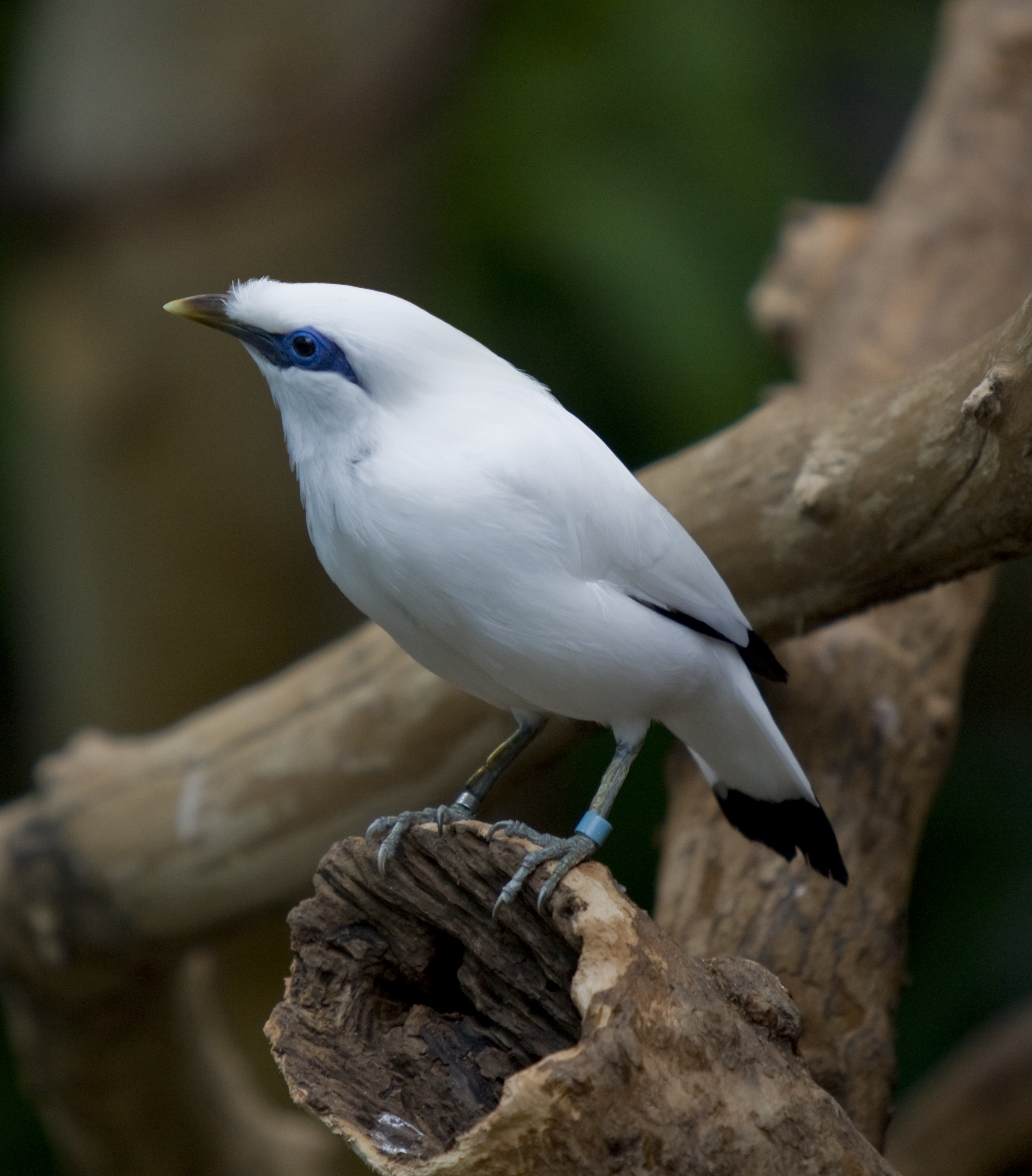
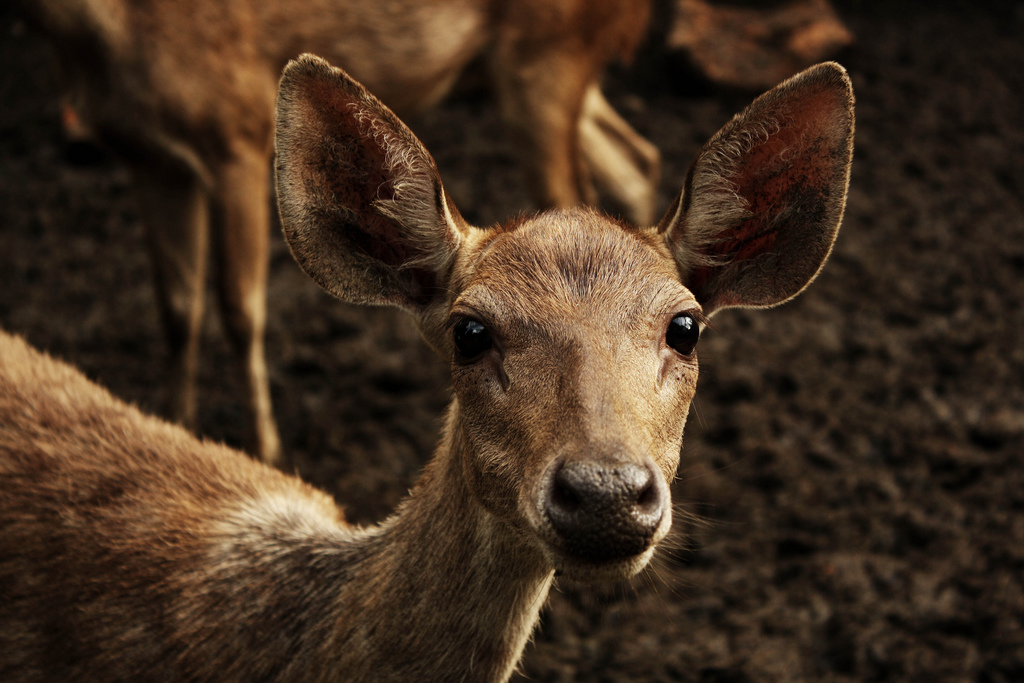
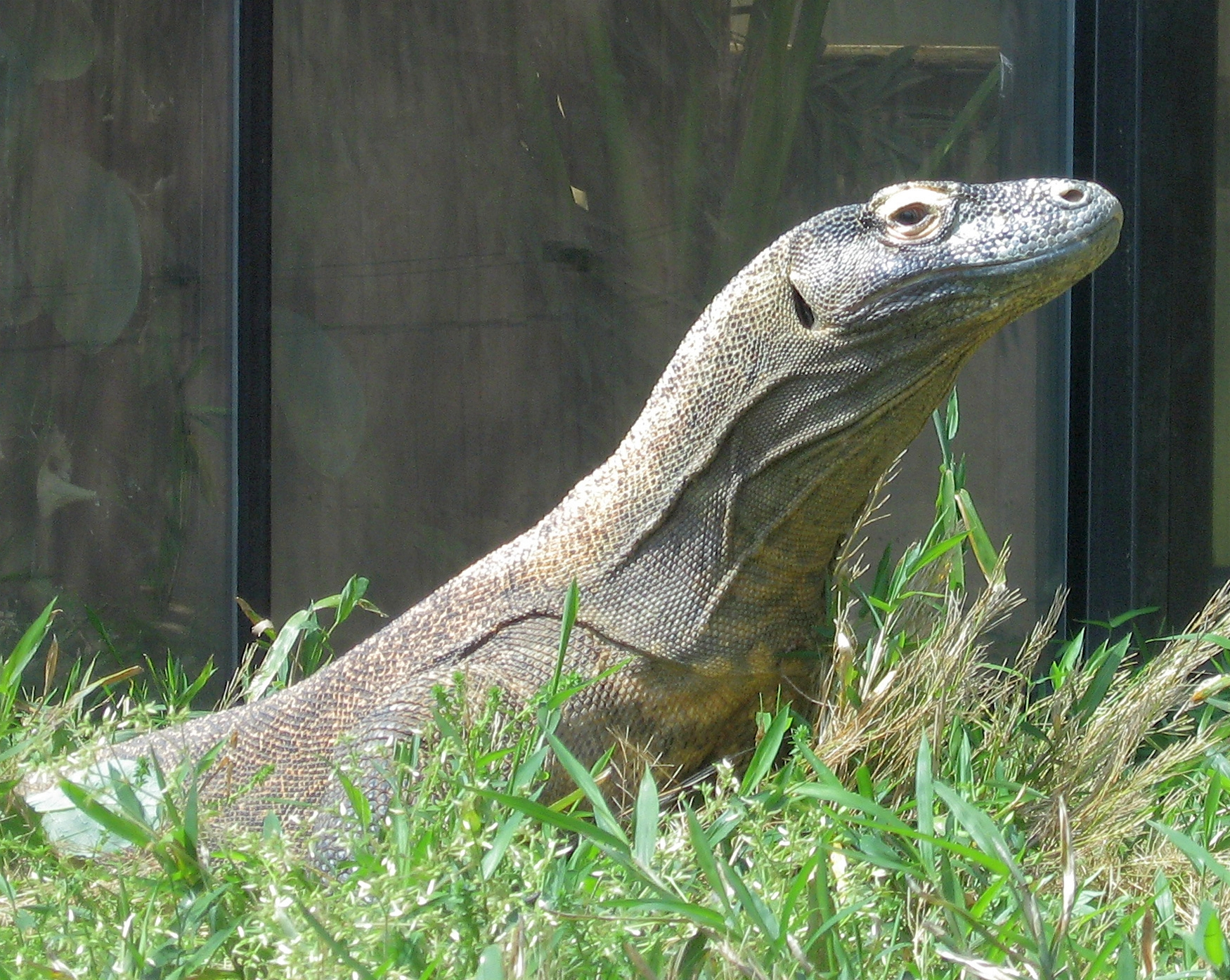
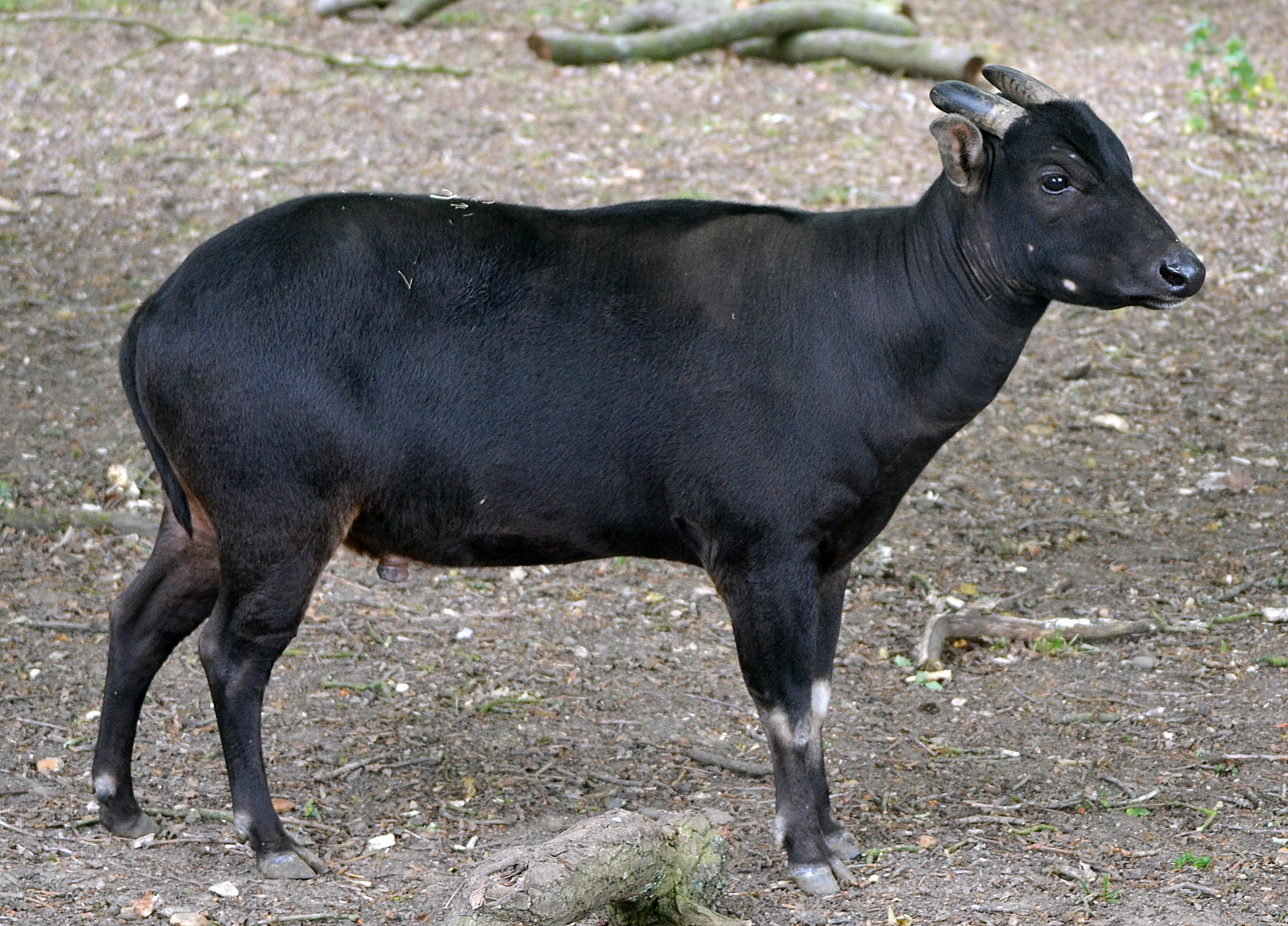
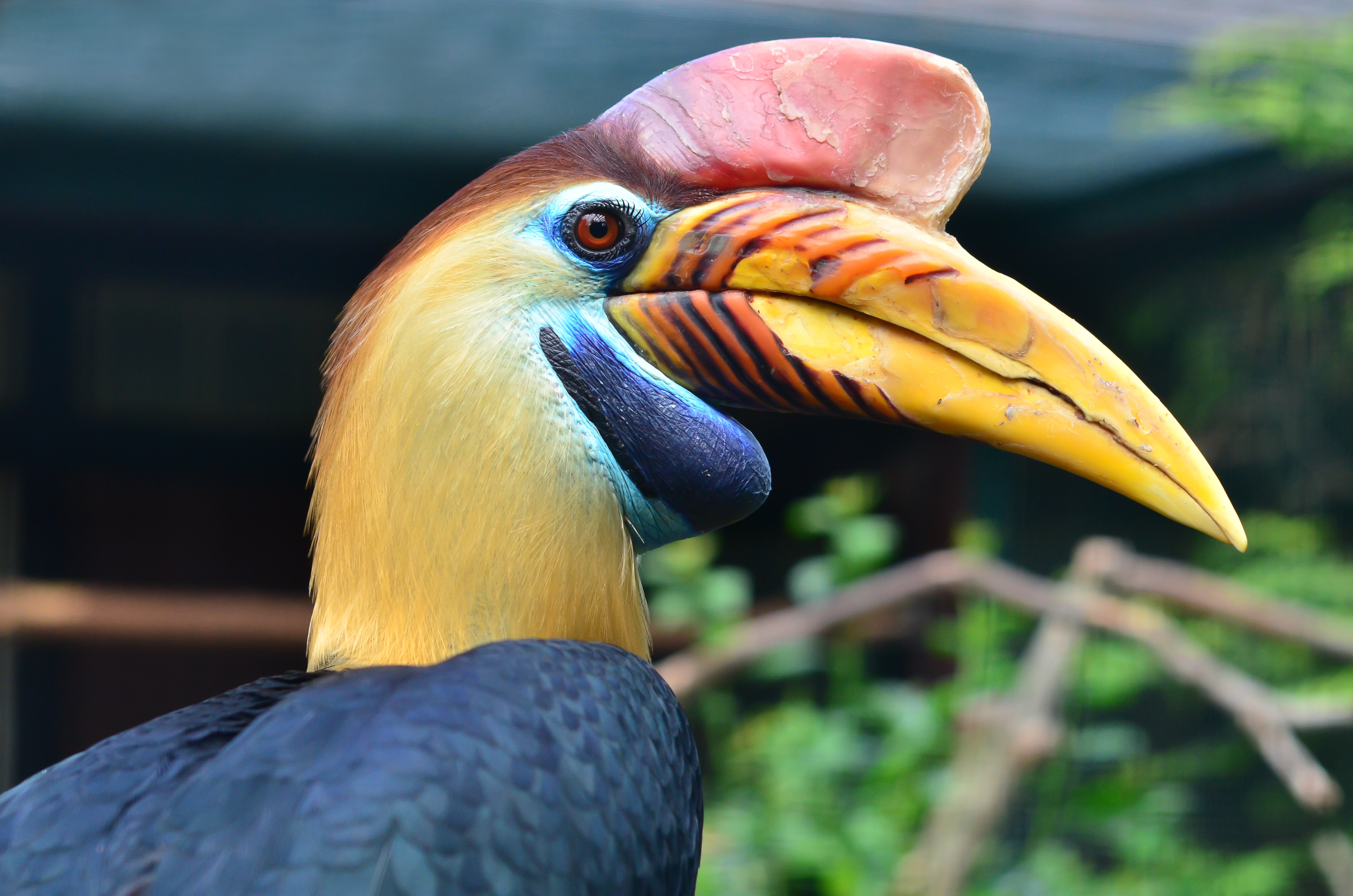
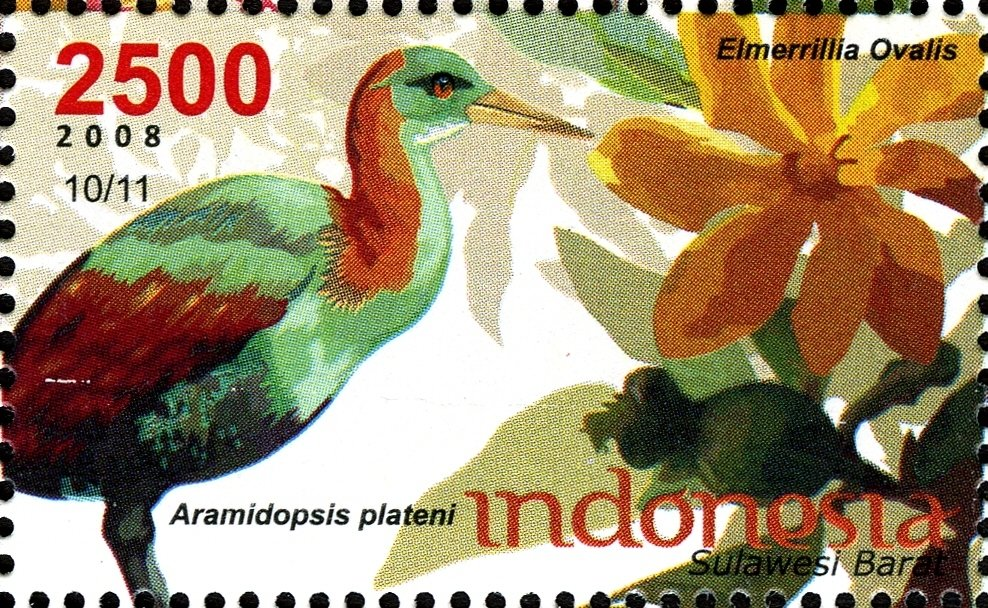
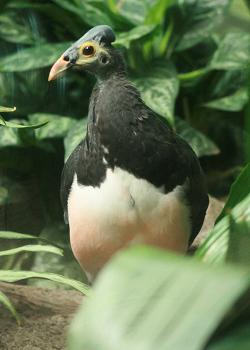
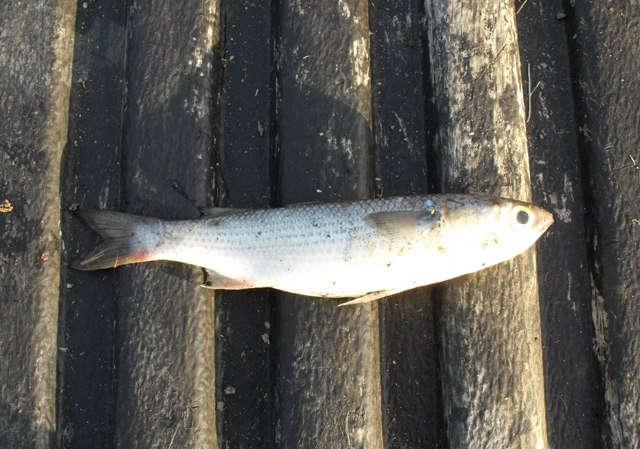
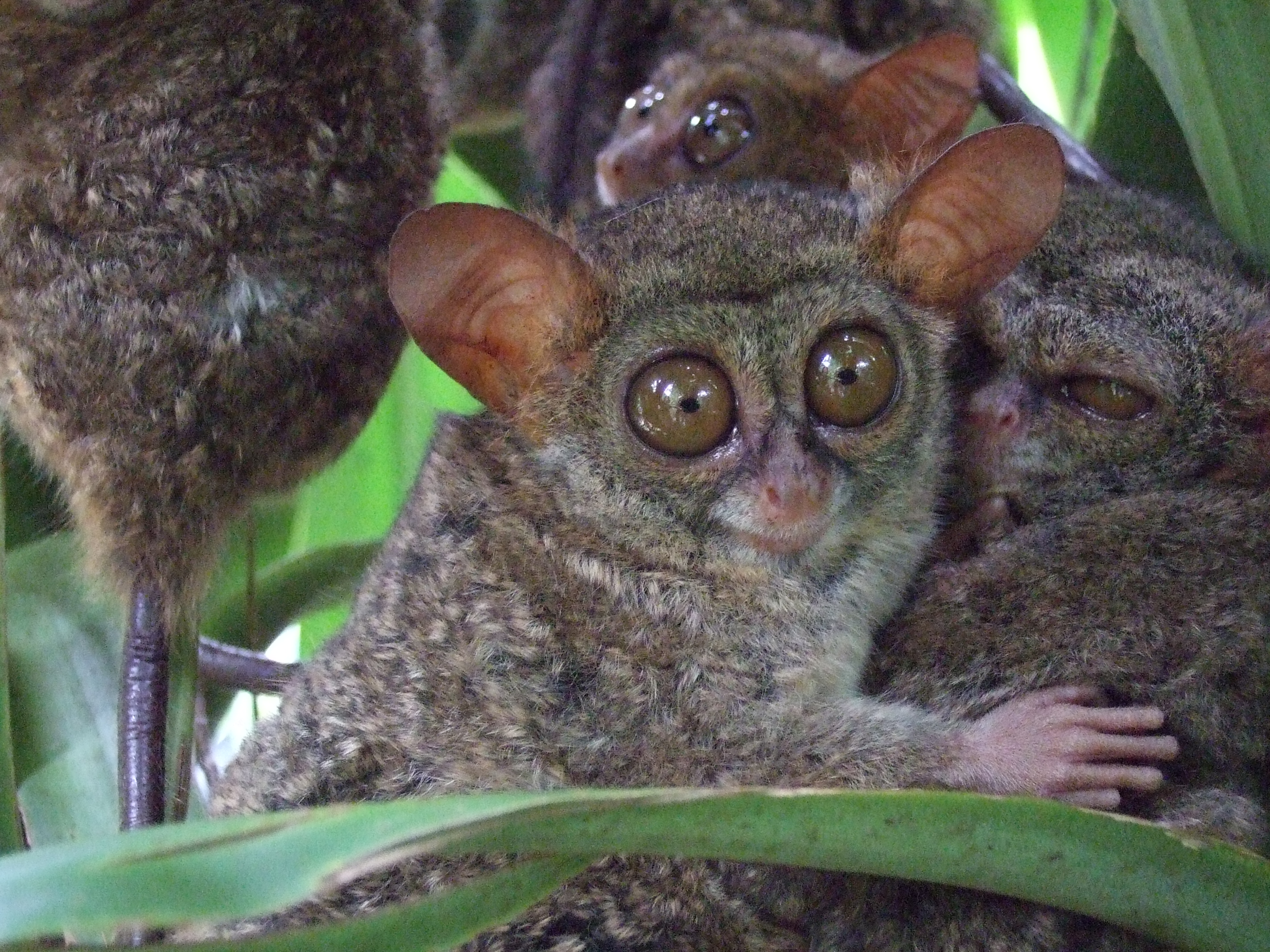
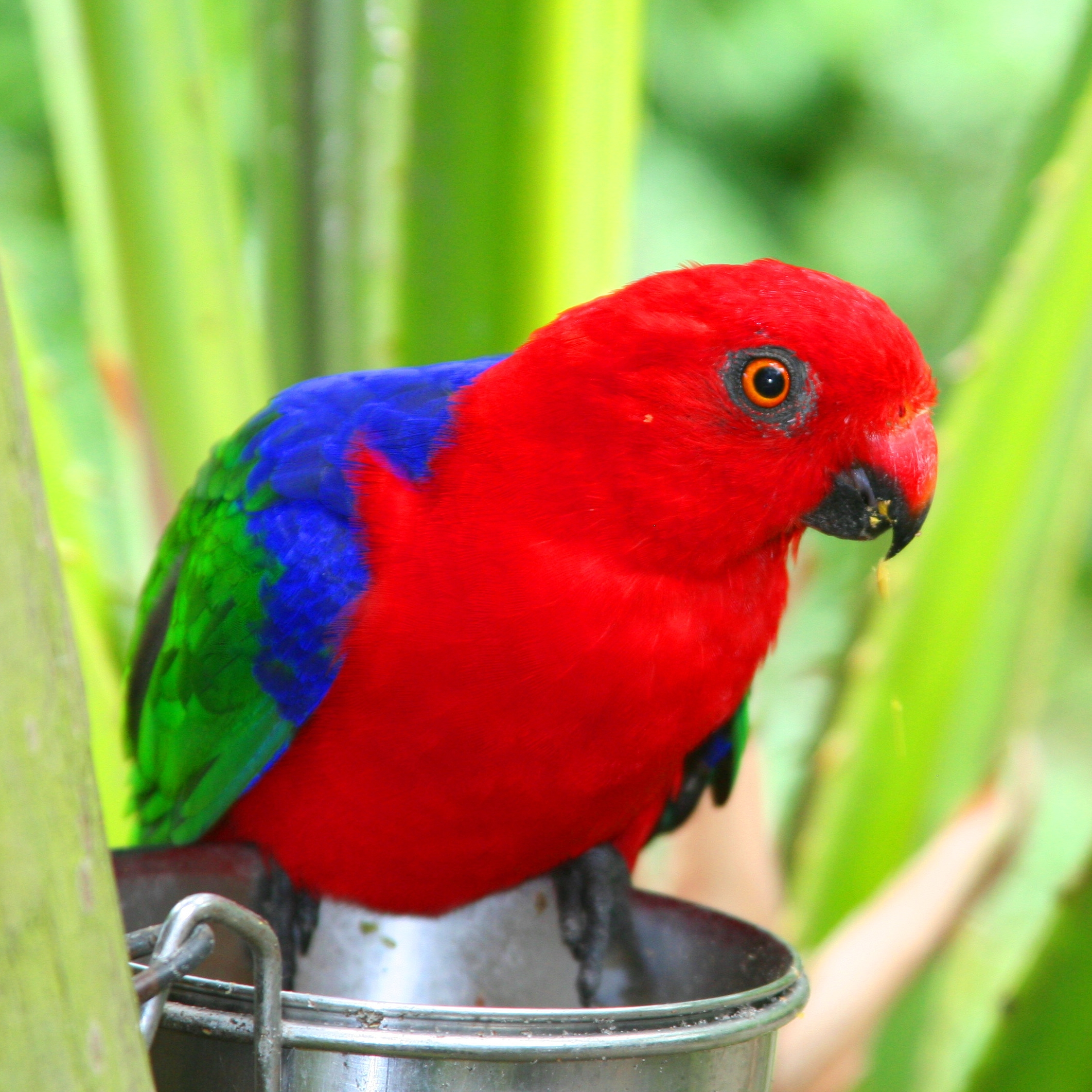
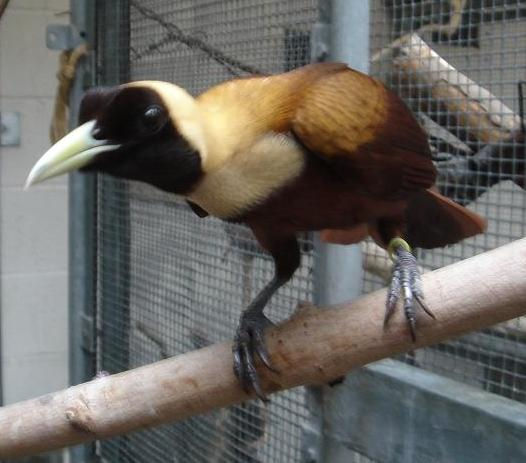
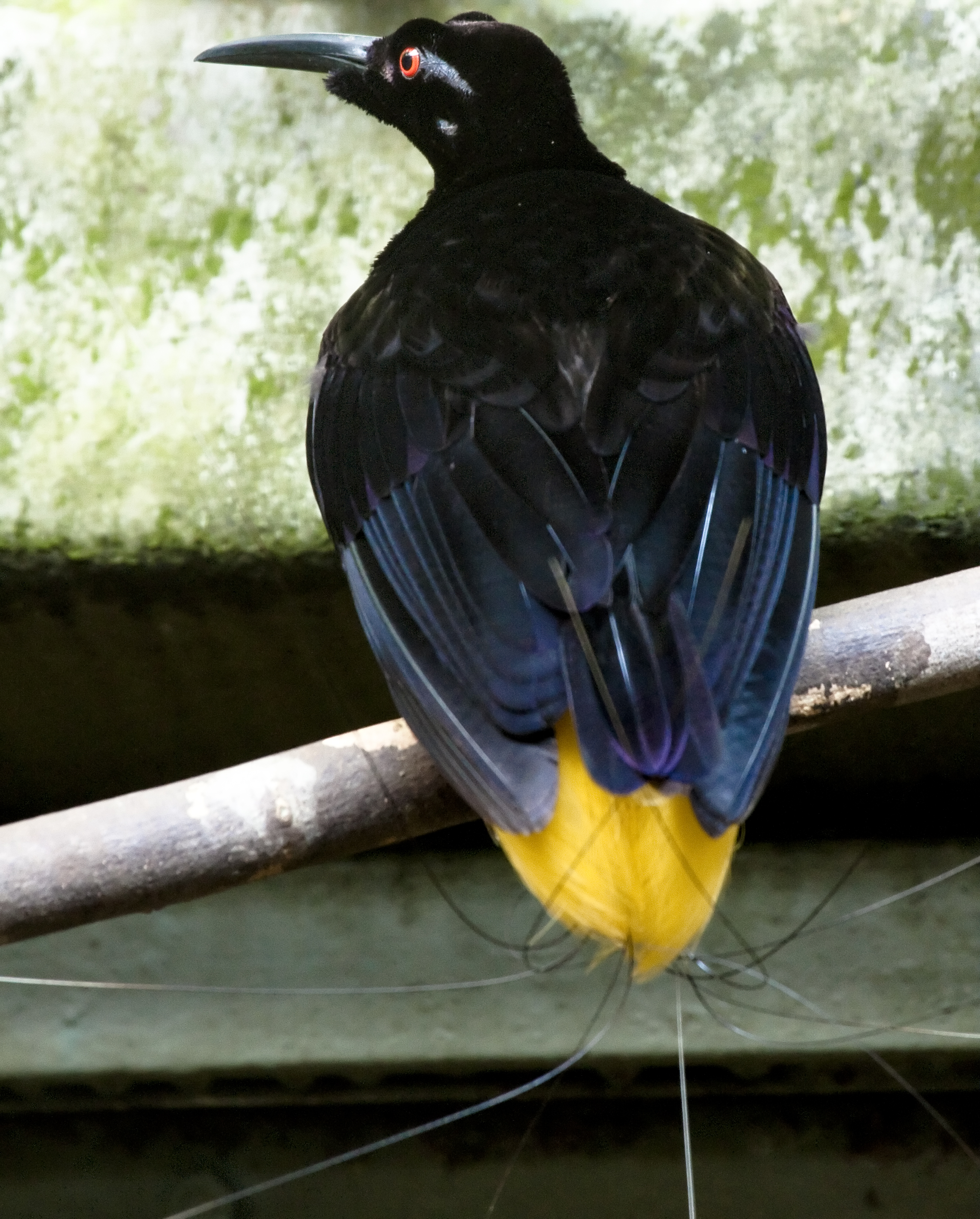
Province	Provincial identity animal	Image
Aceh	Rufous-tailed shama
North Sumatra	Nias hill myna
West Sumatra	Great argus
Riau	Blue-crowned hanging parrot
Riau Islands	Humphead snapper
Jambi	Sumatran tiger
South Sumatra	Giant featherback
Bangka–Belitung Islands	Horsfield's tarsier
Bengkulu	Sun bear
Lampung	Sumatran elephant
Banten	Javan rhinoceros
Jakarta	Brahminy kite
West Java	Javan leopard
Central Java	Black-naped oriole
Special Region of Yogyakarta	Zebra dove
East Java	Bekisar
West Kalimantan	Helmeted hornbill
Central Kalimantan	Bornean peacock-pheasant
East Kalimantan	Irrawaddy dolphin
North Kalimantan	Rhinoceros hornbill
South Kalimantan	Proboscis monkey
Bali	Bali starling
West Nusa Tenggara	Sunda deer
East Nusa Tenggara	Komodo dragon
South East Sulawesi	Anoa
South Sulawesi	Knobbed hornbill
West Sulawesi	Snoring rail
Central Sulawesi	Maleo
Gorontalo	Dussumier's mullet
North Sulawesi	Spectral tarsier
North Maluku	Standardwing
Maluku	Moluccan king parrot
West Papua	Red bird-of-paradise
Papua	Twelve-wired bird-of-paradise

Meanwhile, Helmeted friarbird (Philemon buceroides) was designated as faunal emblem of ex-province Timor Timur (1976–1999).

== See also ==
- List of Indonesian floral emblems
