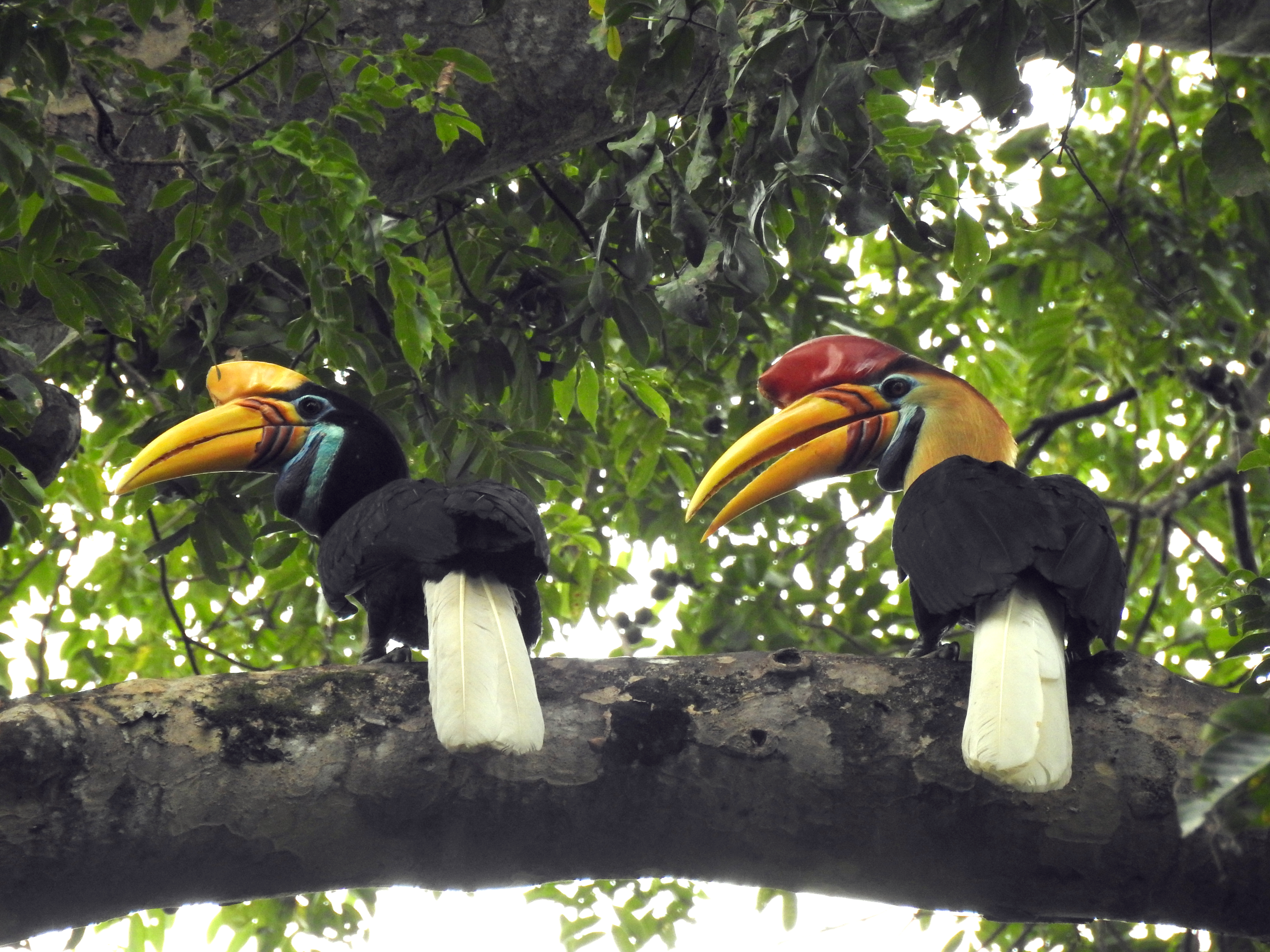
- A pair (female on left, male on right) in the forest canopy Tangkoko Nature Reserve, Sulawesi

Conservation status
- Vulnerable (IUCN 3.1)
- CITES Appendix II

Scientific classification
- Kingdom: Animalia
- Phylum: Chordata
- Class: Aves
- Order: Bucerotiformes
- Family: Bucerotidae
- Genus: Rhyticeros
- Species: R. cassidix

Binomial name
- Rhyticeros cassidix (Temminck, 1823)

Synonyms
- Aceros cassidix Temminck, 1823

= Knobbed hornbill =

Species of bird

The knobbed hornbill (Rhyticeros cassidix), also known as Sulawesi wrinkled hornbill, is a colourful hornbill native to Indonesia. The species is sometimes placed in the genus Aceros. The knobbed hornbill is the faunal symbol of South Sulawesi province.

== Description ==
The knobbed hornbill is a large black hornbill with a yellow bill, white tail feathers, pale blue skin around eye, blackish feet and bare dark blue throat. Like other hornbills, the species is sexually dimorphic. The male has a rufous/buff face and neck, orange-red eyes, and a high red casque on the top of his bill. The female has a black face and neck, a yellow casque, and brownish eyes.

== Distribution and habitat ==
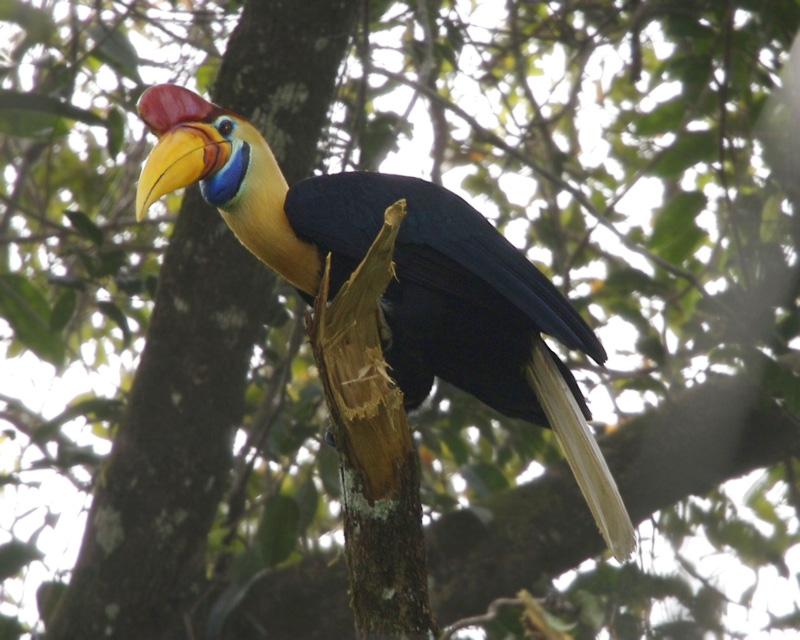
Male

An Indonesian endemic, the knobbed hornbill is found in Sulawesi, Buton, Lembeh, Togian and Muna Island. It inhabits evergreen forest at an elevation of up to 1,800 m and also makes use of secondary forest, woodland and plantations for foraging.

== Ecology ==
As with other hornbills, the knobbed hornbill is believed to be monogamous. Its diet consists mainly of fruits, but it will also take insects and small vertebrates. Breeding season spans 27–30 weeks and appears to be triggered by a dramatic reduction in rainfall. The female seals itself inside a tree hole for egg-laying using its own feces. During this time, the male will provide foods for the female and the young through a slit in the seal.

Knobbed hornbills are important seed dispersers in their habitat and influence the initial fate of seeds of several tropical forest tree species.

== Conservation ==
The species is currently classified as vulnerable by the IUCN. While common in their remaining habitats, they are threatened by habitat destruction from logging (since they depend on large and mature trees for breeding), and to a lesser extent by hunting.

== Gallery ==
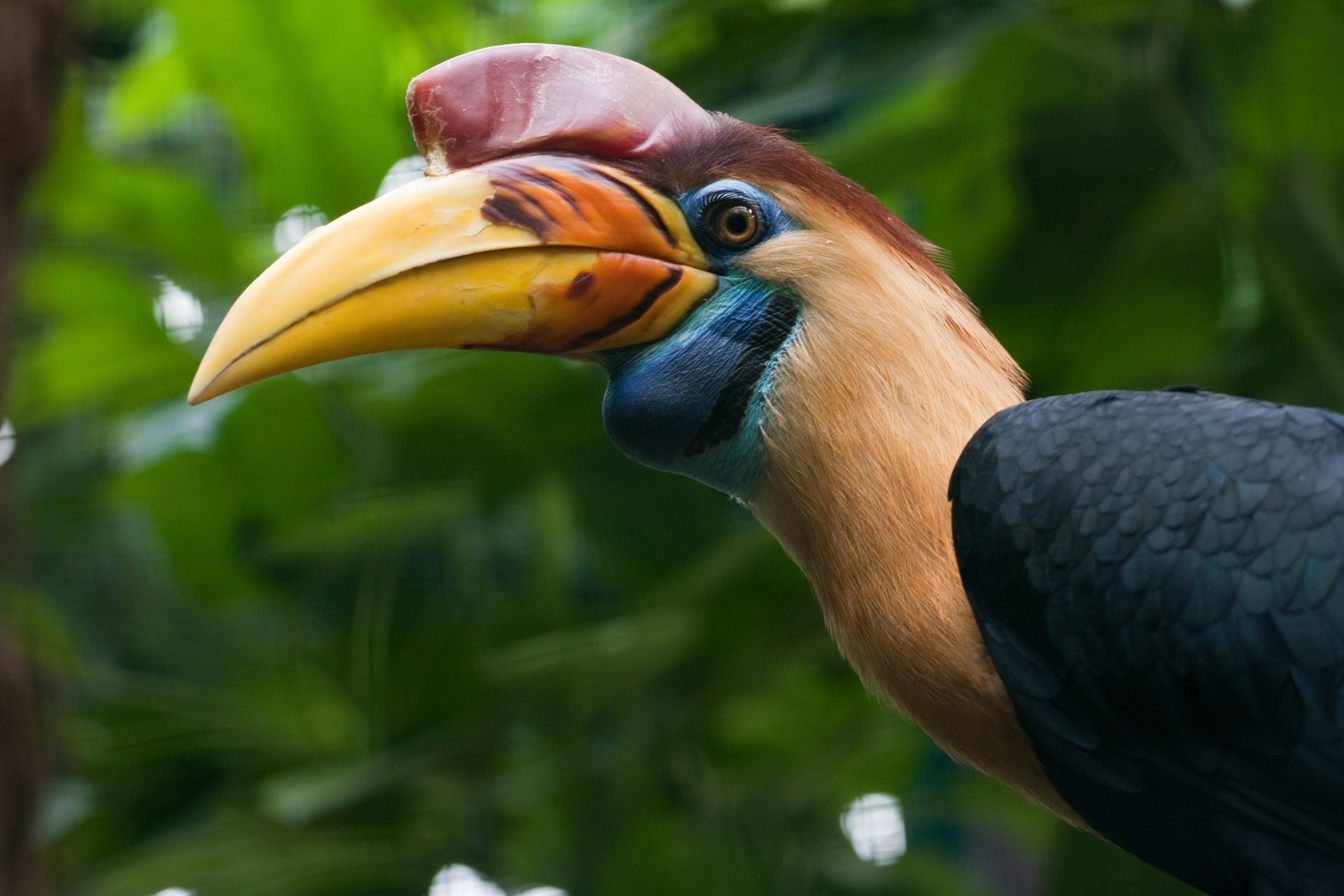
Male at Walsrode Bird Park

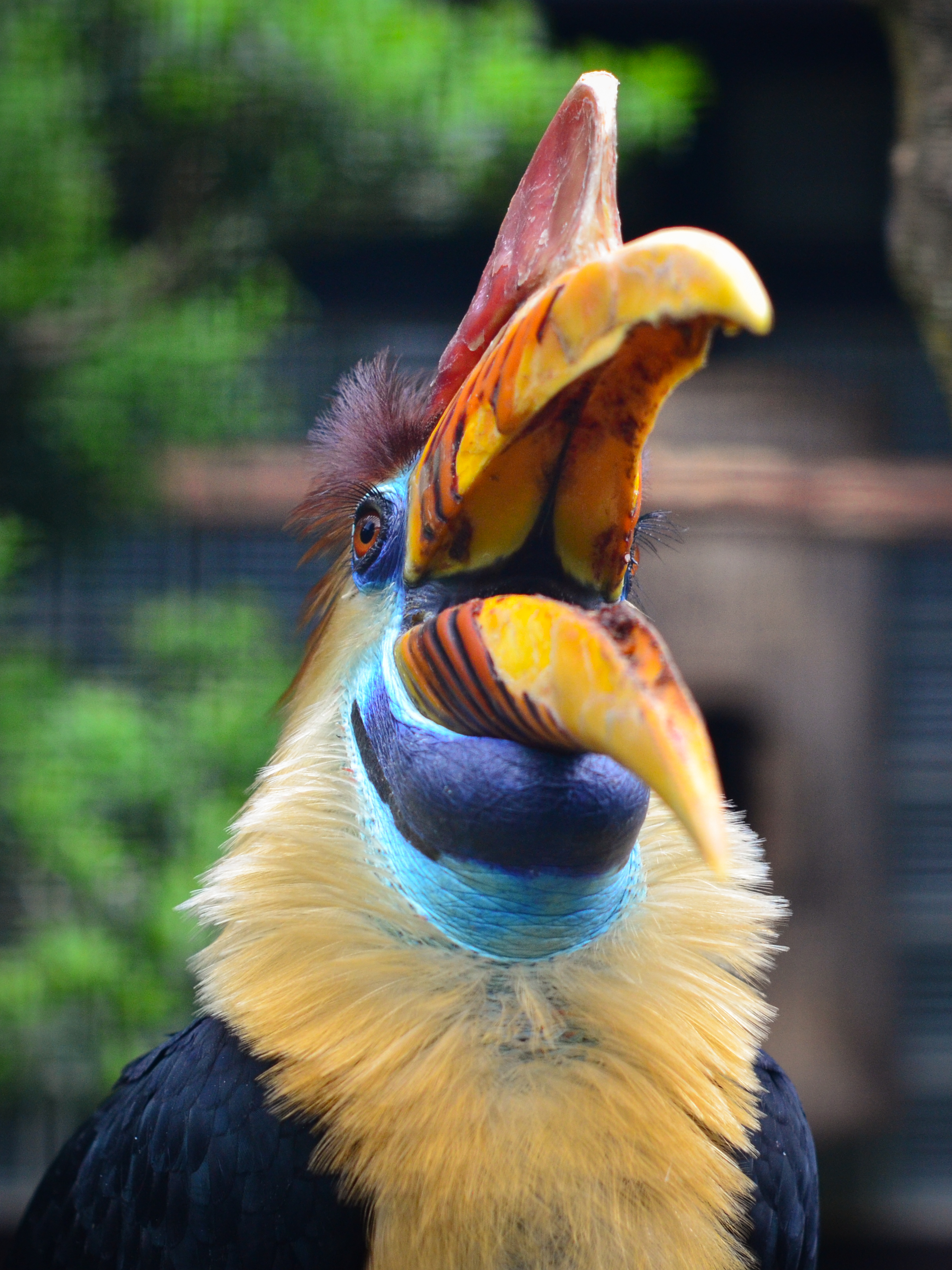
A male with its bill open at Walsrode Bird Park

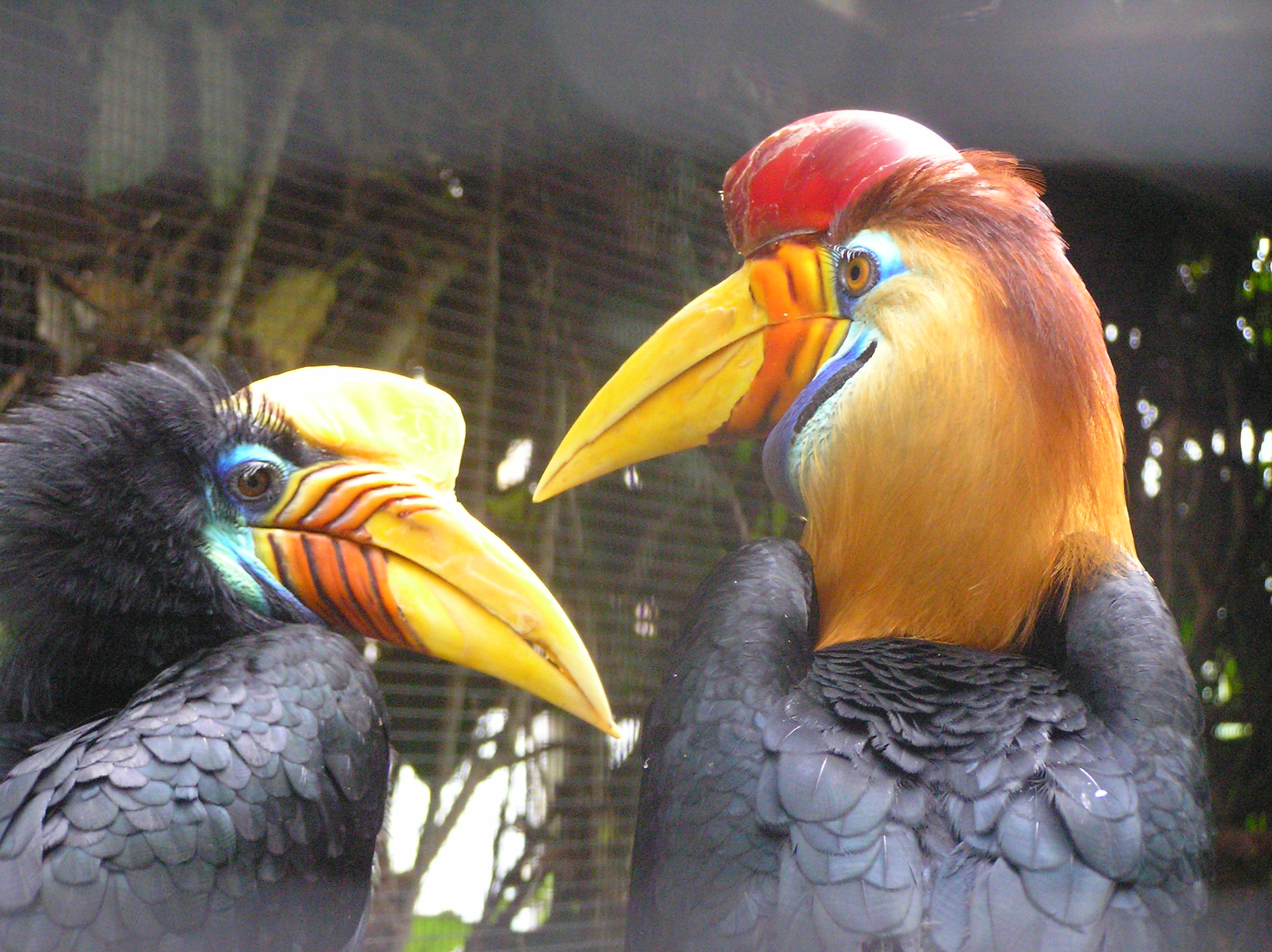
Female (left) and male (right) in 2005

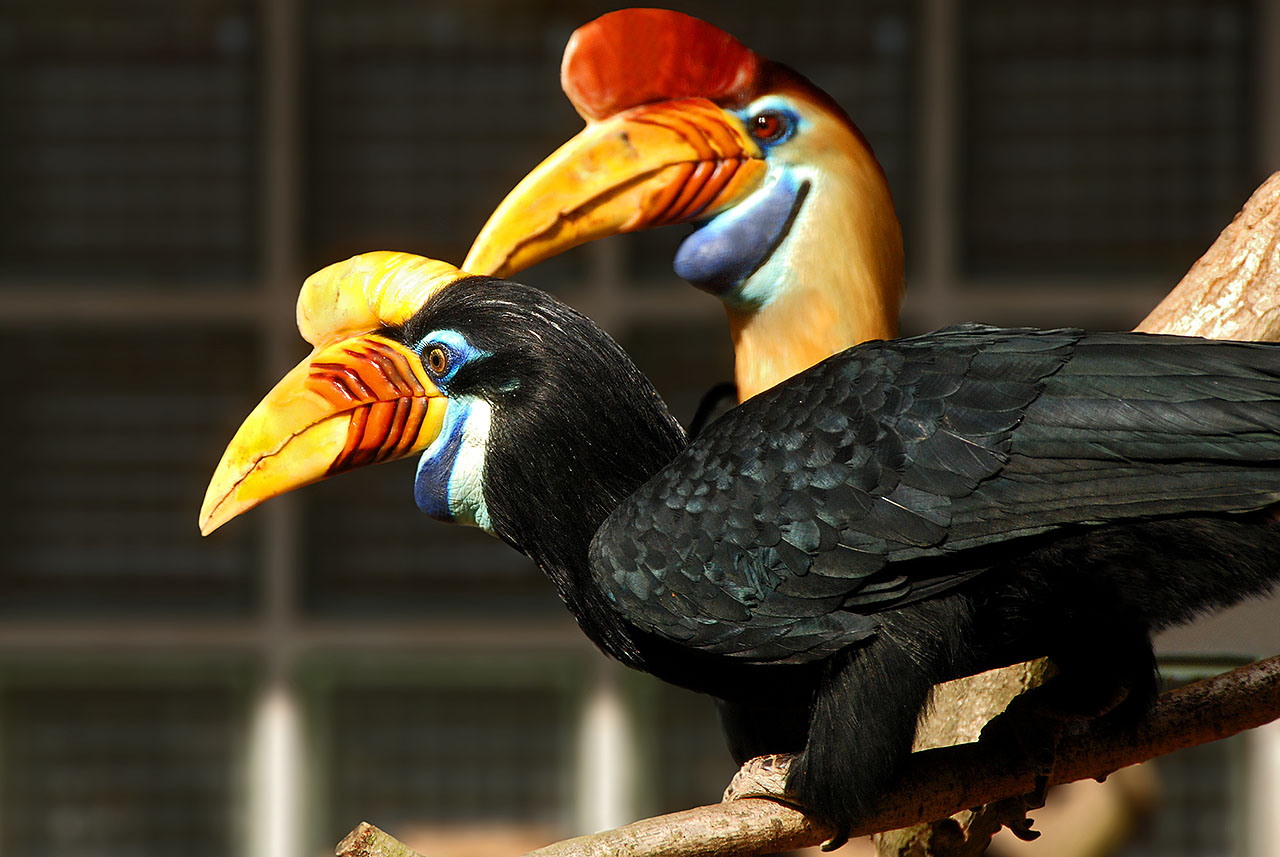
Pair at Walsrode Bird Park, Germany

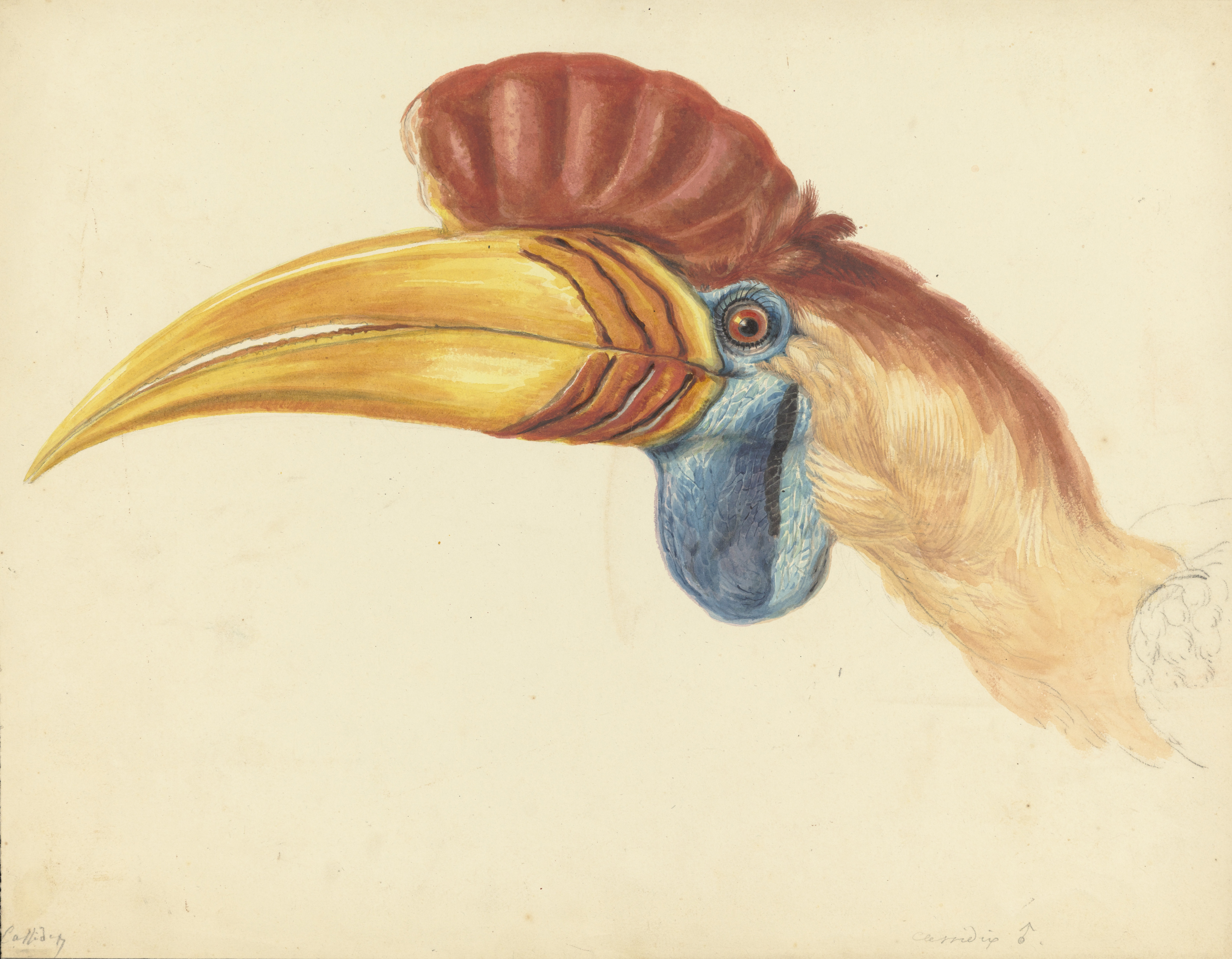
Early drawing by the Dutch colonial Natuurkundige Commissie voor Nederlands-Indië, 1820s.

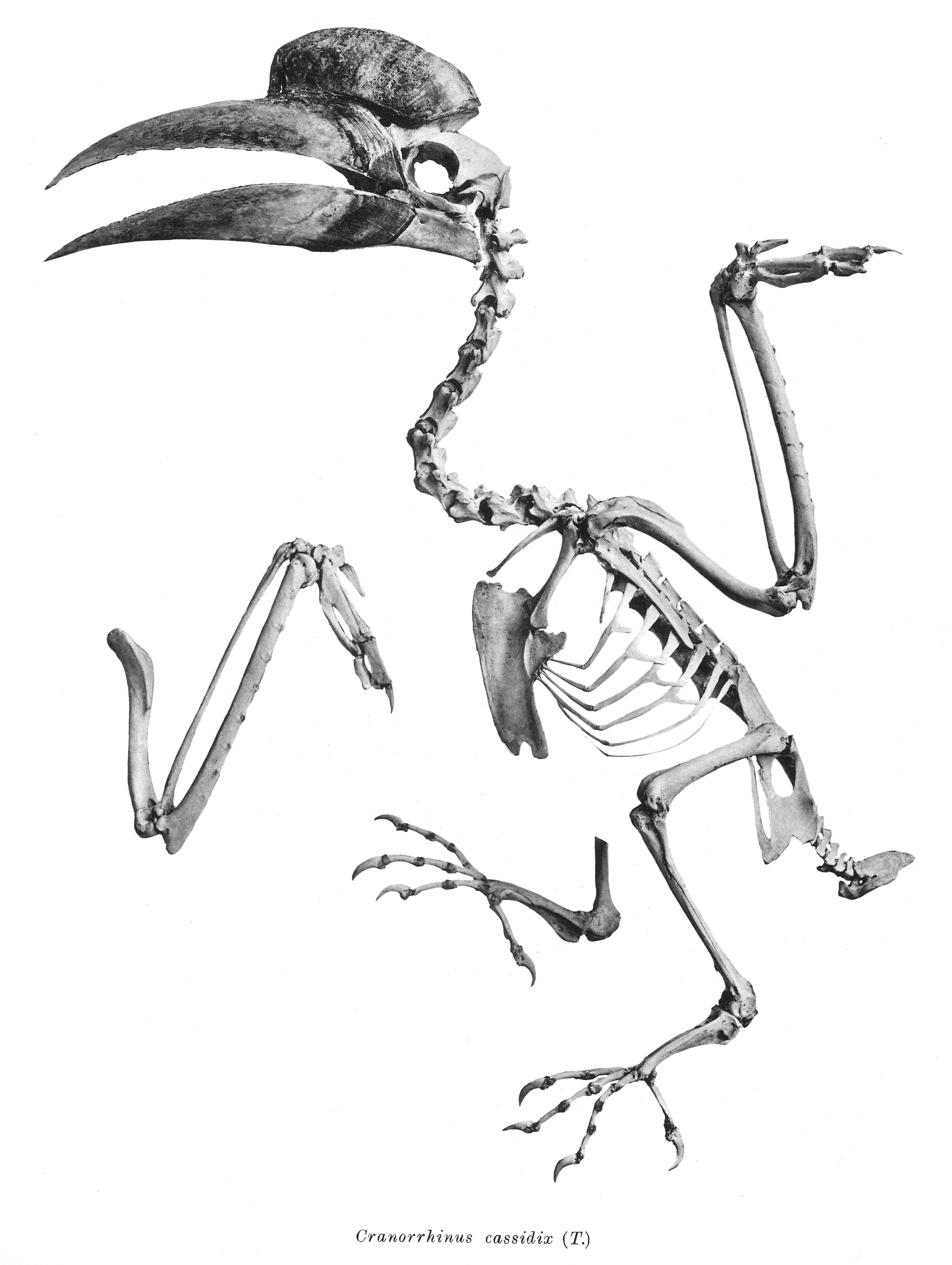
Skeleton
