= Climate change in Indonesia =

Emissions, impacts and responses of Indonesia

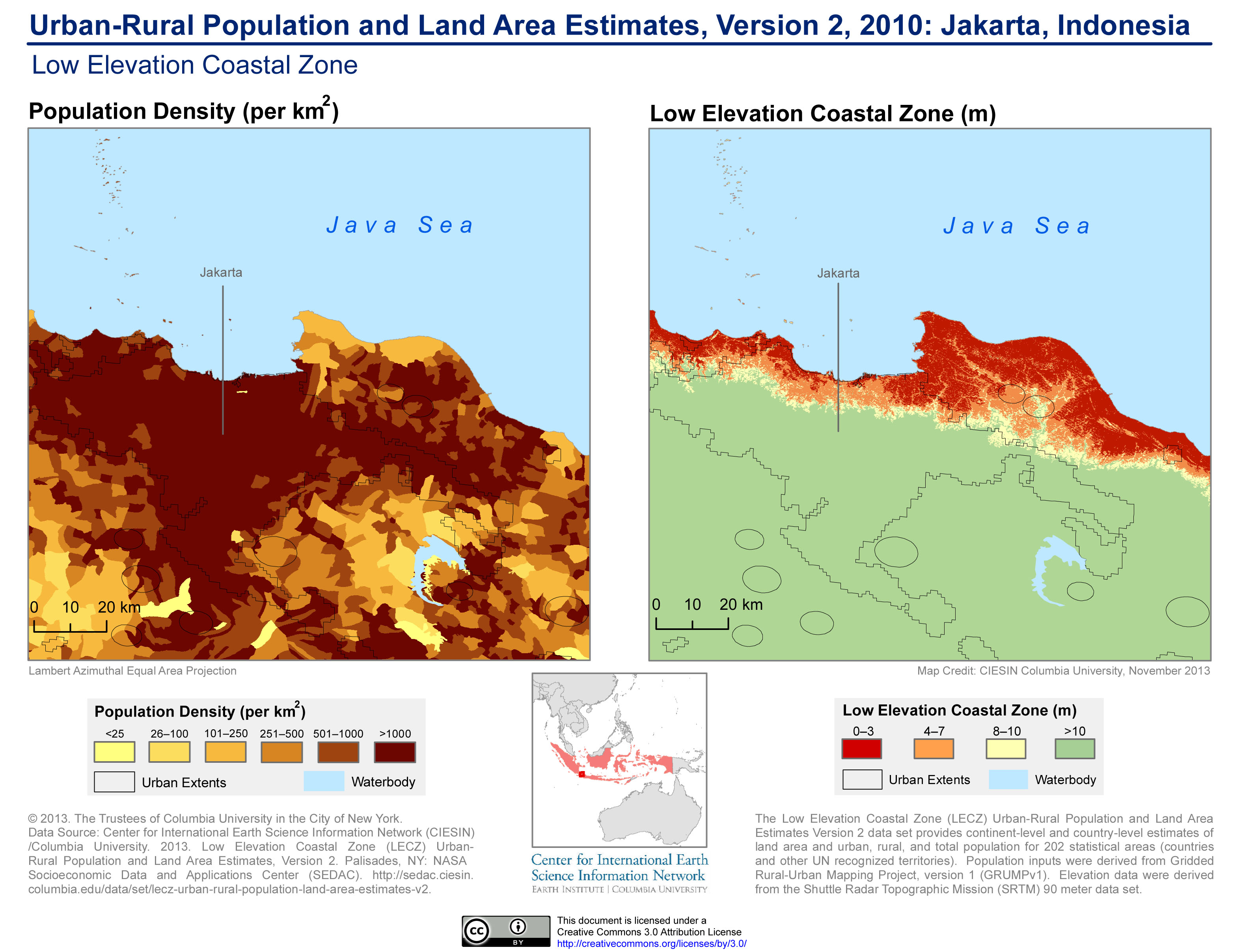
Low elevation coastal zones and population density in Jakarta. The city is one of the world's most vulnerable cities to the impacts of climate change.

Due to its geographical and natural diversity, Indonesia is one of the countries most susceptible to the impacts of climate change. This is supported by the fact that Jakarta has been listed as the world's most vulnerable city, regarding climate change. It is also a major contributor as of the countries that has contributed most to greenhouse gas emissions due to its high rate of deforestation and reliance on coal power.

Made up of more than 17,000 islands and with a long coastline, Indonesia stands particularly vulnerable to the effects of rising sea levels and extreme weather events such as floods, droughts, and storms. Its vast areas of tropical forests are vital in balancing out climate change by taking in carbon dioxide from the atmosphere. Projected impacts on Indonesia's agricultural sector, national economy and health are also significant issues.

Indonesia has committed to reducing its emissions within the framework of the Copenhagen Accord and Paris Agreement. Despite the significant impacts of climate change on the country, surveys show that Indonesia has a high proportion of climate change deniers.

== Greenhouse gas emissions ==
Cumulative greenhouse gas emissions by country

Indonesia is one of the world's largest emitters of greenhouse gases due to its large deforestation and forest degradation. Since 2010, Indonesia has been actively involved in the REDD+ program (Reducing Emissions from Deforestation and Forest Degradation), which incentivizes developing countries to reduce deforestation and forest degradation to lower their greenhouse gas emissions. The country strives to achieve these goals by collaborating with national and local stakeholders, setting up a monitoring system to track emissions and forest cover, and integrating policies and institutional frameworks. Not only does this REDD+ program reduce Indonesia's greenhouse gas emissions, but it also protects biodiversity and benefits local communities. While the program looks promising for the future, its implementation in Indonesia is hindered by various obstacles, such as poor governance and institutional capacity, insufficient funding, and tenure issues.

Apart from REDD+, Indonesia has the potential to leverage other forest-based climate change mitigation measures such as sustainable forest management and agroforestry. This is important because it ensures that forests are managed in a way that balances economic, social, and environmental objectives. They do this by promoting the conservation and sustainable use of forest resources while also maintaining their carbon stocks.

Despite the goal of reducing greenhouse gas emissions by 29% by the end of 2030, Indonesia has made little progress in reducing emissions in recent years. This can be traced back to the lack of financial support, prevalence of coal-fired power plants, and ongoing deforestation. From 2014 to 2019, Indonesia's emissions increased by 2.2%. To counter all these challenges, the Indonesian government aims to increase the use of renewable energy sources and try to phase out coal. In order to achieve this, there is a need for more concrete action and effective policies to address greenhouse gas emissions.

== Impacts on the natural environment ==
=== Temperature and climate change projections ===
Indonesia is almost entirely dominated by a tropical climate with air humidities of up to 90% and hot average temperatures of 28 °C in warmer areas. Precipitation mainly exists in low areas and regions of higher altitudes with cold temperatures. During the El Niño, there is less precipitation and during La Niña events, there are more rainfalls. The climate can be divided into wet seasons from November to April and dry seasons from May to October.

According to climate projections, the average temperatures will rise by 1.6 °C by the year 2050 and by 3.9 °C by 2100 under a high-emissions scenario with no limitations in greenhouse gas emissions. Precipitation estimates are largely complex under all scenarios because of the diverse regional patterns that can be found throughout the country.

It is estimated that, under a high-emissions scenario centered at 2050 with respect to the reference time frame 1985–2014, there will be around 8% longer heatwaves with an increase of 98% in heatwave frequency which entails more extreme weather events like droughts and increased runoff processes leading to flooding and other destructive processes.

=== Marine ecosystems ===
As Indonesia forms the largest archipelago in the world, marine environments are of high importance for the livelihoods and food security of millions of people. With changing climate trends, these ecosystems are gravely impacted.

Oceanic warming and enrichment in CO_{2} concentrations due to higher greenhouse gas contents in the atmosphere affect the health of coral reef areas and can lead to bleaching and the ultimately the death of the ecosystem. This in turn affects the health, diversity and abundance of species in that whole area and indirectly connected marine parts of the country. Not only does the acidification of the sea water cause lasting harm to the coral reefs through bleaching but it also triggers declines in plankton abundance in general. This causes a change of balance in the entire food web since plankton serves as a food source for a variety of marine organisms.

Due to the increased incidence of extreme weather events such as storms and typhoons predicted for the future climate, vulnerable marine environments like coral reefs will experience further damage.

Rises in sea levels already are particularly challenging for Indonesia. Estimates show that around 42 million people living less than 10 meters above sea level are menaced. This will have effects like coastal erosion, flooding and loss of habitats crucial for biodiversity like mangrove forests which create breeding grounds for fish and a high number of other marine species. If these areas of high biodiversity decrease in size and abundance, fish populations will decline.

Increased temperatures coupled with changing climatic conditions may have negative impacts on ocean currents and the distribution of fish populations, creating fluctuations in the availability and distribution of stocks. This causes imbalances in the food web system.

=== Terrestrial environment ===
Köppen climate classification map for Indonesia for 1980–2016

2071–2100 map under the most intense climate change scenario. Mid-range scenarios are currently considered more likely

The impact of climate change upon the terrestrial environment of Indonesia is varied. Indonesia has one of the highest rates of deforestation in the world, much of which is driven by agricultural and logging industries. A study in 2022 estimated that the emissions impact from deforestation fires in Indonesia and Brazil was 3.7 (±0.4) and 1.9 (±0.2) Gt CO2eq in 2019 and 2020, respectively. Consequently, Indonesia's terrestrial environment has suffered from land changes, deforestation, changes to the groundwater table, reduction in biodiversity and ecosystem structural changes. An increase in extreme weather events due to climate change, notably forest fires in Indonesia have further contributed to the emission of greenhouse gas emissions.

The estimated anthropogenic effects upon bioregions have been measured using the Human Footprint analysis. Human footprint is a measure of pressures from human populations, transportation infrastructure, housing and land transformations upon the integrity of natural systems and environments. Between 2012 and 2017, the human footprint of all bioregions within national parks and in a 10 km buffer area outside the park were reported to have increased in Indonesia.

Around 2.2 million Ha of degraded forests exists within 'protected areas' in Indonesia, accounting for about 10% of total protected areas. The majority of peatlands in Indonesia have been subject to logging, agricultural expansion and plantation resulting in the drainage of peat. The drainage of peatlands are associated with increases in erosion, release of carbon dioxide due to exposure of organic material, loss of biodiversity and changes in the topography of the landscape due to processes such as subsidence.

=== Peatlands and fire ===
In Indonesia, peatlands began to accumulate following the last glacial period as a result of the extremely wet climate conditions. One can find between 160 and 270.000 km^{2} of peatlands of which the biggest part is located on the sub-coastal lowlands. Not only are they home to numerous species, but they serve as a natural carbon sink, are used for agriculture and settlements, act as a control system, and stabilize the landscape against erosion. In recent decades, the occurrence of extensive degradation, due to human activities, in Indonesia has risen, resulting in the nation becoming the fourth-largest contributor to carbon dioxide emissions.

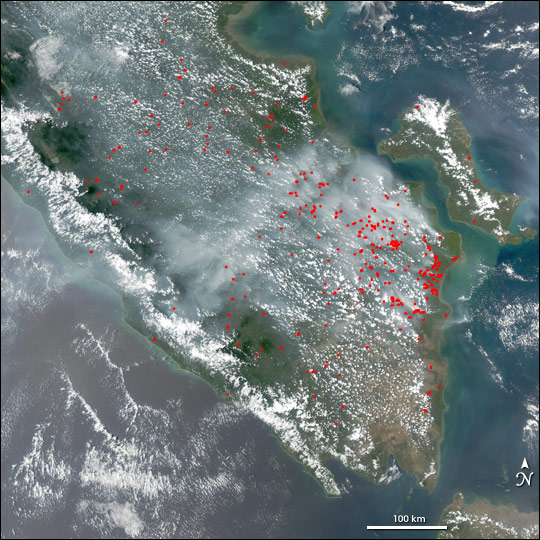
Forest fires in Borneo and Sumatra causing haze

Peatlands are vital ecosystems of wetlands on land, where water logging conditions inhibit the complete decomposition of plant material. The organic matter accumulates as peat, which can store a large amount of carbon. Peatlands are known to play a crucial role in the mitigation of climate change due to their sequestration abilities of carbon from the atmosphere. But in the last 20 years (2001–2021), there has been an increase in fires which led to a decrease of 18% of the tree cover in Indonesia, producing 19.7 Gt of CO_{2} emissions. Over 90% of this tree cover loss is due to deforestation. Burning peatlands is a major cause of carbon emissions, releasing carbon dioxide and other greenhouse gases which contribute to climate change. These peat fires are responsible for up to 5% of the world's total annual emissions, as well as significant air pollution that can have serious health implications on local communities. As such, it is essential that effective strategies are put in place to prevent and manage peatland burning both now and in the future.

=== Biodiversity ===
Indonesia is home to a wide variety of flora and fauna. The main factors affecting the loss of biodiversity in Indonesia are habitat degradation, fragmentation, introduced species, overexploitation, climate change, fires and the economic and political crisis.

Indonesia is home to about 12% of the world's mammals (515 species), ranking it second for fauna diversity after Brazil. The cumulative effect of climate change and anthropological activities have contributed to the decline of animal populations and biodiversity in Indonesia. It has been estimated that 25% of Indonesia's native mammals are endangered. The population of Sumatran elephants has been estimated to have dropped by 35% since the 1990s. Tigers and Sumatran primates population levels have not been maintained in protected areas. The Sumatran tigers and orangutans are also critically endangered animals in Indonesia, despite efforts to increase forest density in nature parks.

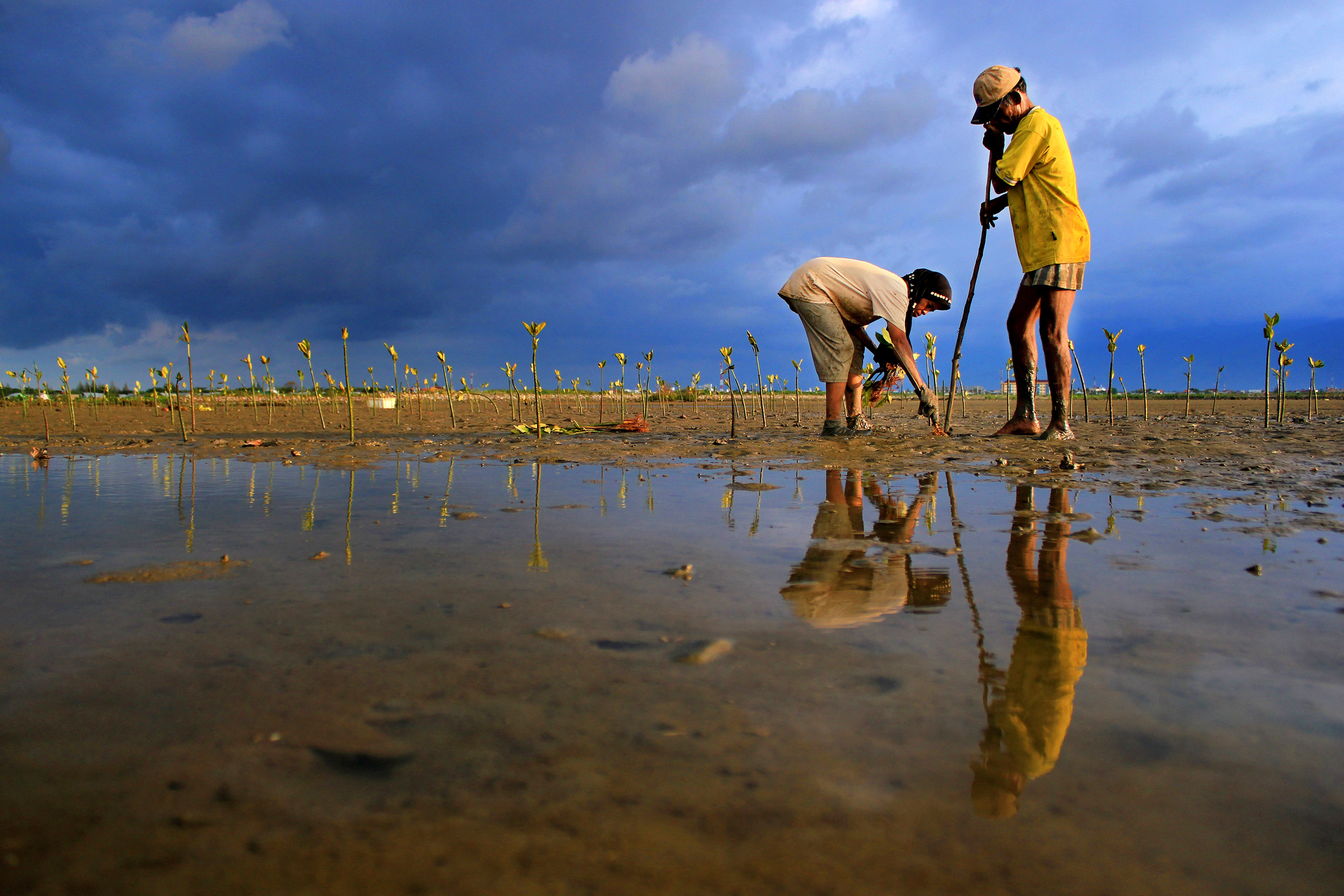
Restoration of mangrove habitat post deforestation. Mangroves provide habitat for a wide range species including the proboscis monkey, estuarine crocodile, amphibious fish species such as mudskippers and a range of birds and reptiles.

In Indonesia, it has been estimated 80% of disasters due to climate change from 1998 to 2018 were flooding (18%), wind storm (26%), landslides (22%) and drought (8%). Increased frequency of such extreme weather events can have direct and indirect impact on species richness through habitat destruction, fragmentation, habitat loss and altering ecosystem processes. Indonesia has about 10% of the world's flowering plant species, 16% of the world's reptiles and 17% of the total species of birds. Despite Indonesia ranking highly on species richness and species diversity, logging, deforestation, agricultural practices and disasters are placing species under constant threat.

Sea level rise due to climate change has been associated with a loss of mangrove forest habitat. Indonesia contains 24% of the worlds mangrove forests. Over the past three decades, 40% of its mangroves have been degraded or lost. These forests provide a breeding ground for many fish, marine species, birds and reptiles. Damage to the mangrove forests on the east coast of North Sumatra has resulted in two-thirds of the area's fish species becoming harder to catch. Indonesia has implemented several initiatives to restore mangrove habitats in effort to preserve ecosystems and stabilise fauna populations that rely on the mangroves as their habitat such as the proboscis monkey and estuarine crocodile.

=== Sea level rise and land subsidence ===
The mean sea level rise globally was 3–10 mm per year, while the subsidence rate for Jakarta was around 75–100 mm per year, making the relative rise in sea level nearly 10 cm per year. Continued carbon emissions at the 2019 rate, in combination with unlicensed groundwater extraction, is predicted to immerse 95% of Northern Jakarta by 2050.

Some studies have suggested that climate change induced sea level rise may be minimal compared to the rise induced by lack of water infrastructure and rapid urban development. The Indonesian government views land subsidence, mostly due to over extraction of groundwater, as the primary threat to Jakarta's infrastructure and development. Dutch urban planning is in large part to blame for the water crisis today as a consequence of canals built during the colonial era which intentionally subdivided the city, segregating indigenous people and Europeans, providing clean water access and infrastructure almost exclusively to European settlers. Due to the lack of access to clean water in Jakarta outside of wealthier communities, many locals have been pushed to extract groundwater without permits. Jakarta's growing population and rapid urban development has been eating away at the surrounding agriculture further destroying natural flood mitigation, such as forests, and polluting river systems relied on by predominantly poorer locals pushing said locals to rely on groundwater. In 2019, water pipes in Jakarta reached only sixty percent of the population.

Despite this being a very pressing issue in the city, almost half of the local population does not know or have not been made aware of the correlation between land subsidence, their extraction and increased flooding making an organized approach to this issue much more difficult. The issue has persisted so long that Indonesia has confirmed the movement of their nation's capital, Jakarta, to a new city in East Kalimantan in the island of Borneo, citing the land subsidence issue as a primary reason. The movement of the capital to Borneo, in part, minimizes the effects of natural disasters due to its strategic location, but the rapid pace of the planned relocation may exacerbate environmental issues on the island in the near future, particularly biodiversity loss.

== Impacts upon people ==
=== Agriculture ===
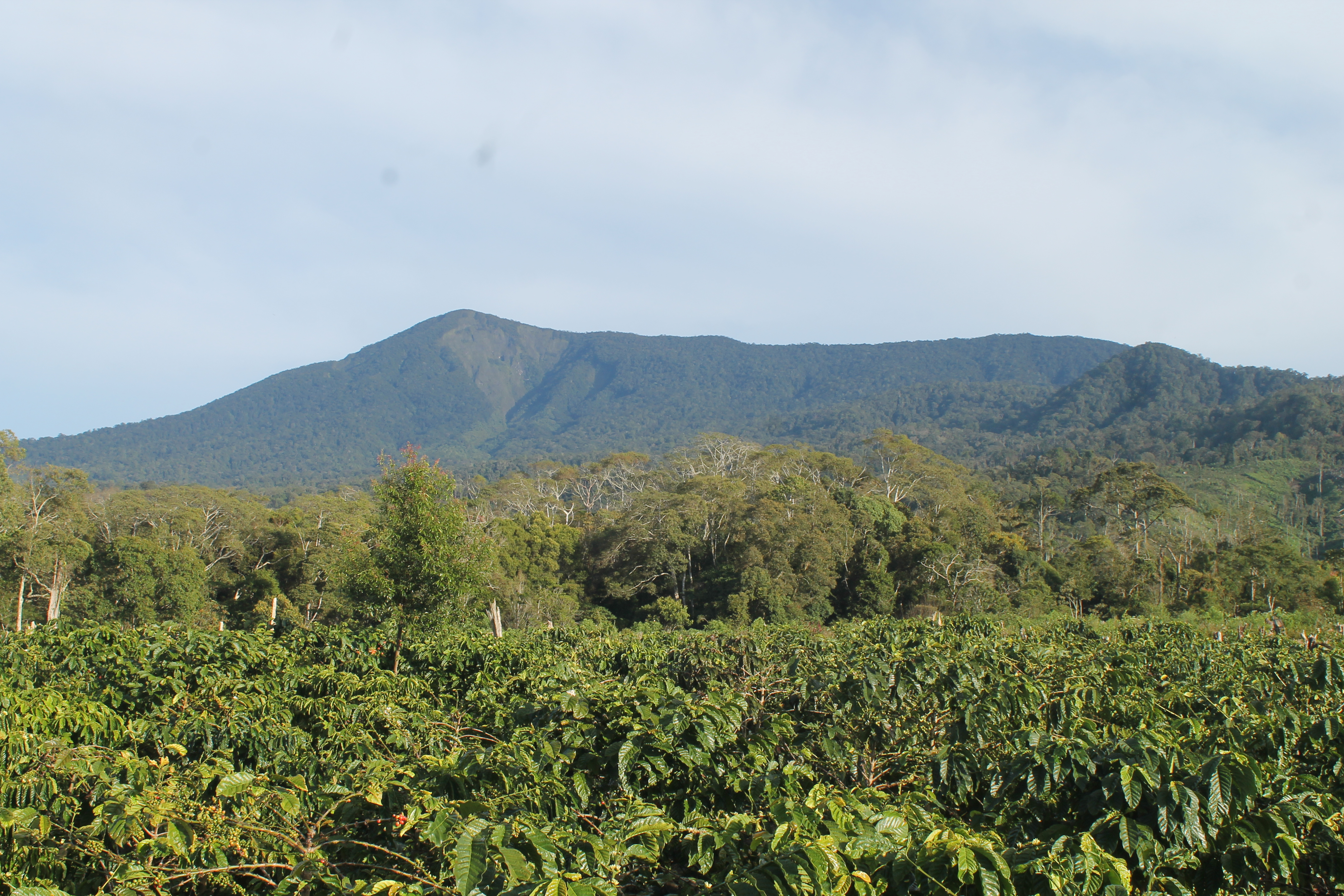
A coffee plantation in Bukit Barisan.

The agricultural sector builds the base of income for the lives of millions of Indonesians. The country's top export products are palm oil, cocoa, coffee, rice, spices, tea, coconuts, fruit and tobacco.

Temperatures, potentially rising by up to 1.5 °C by the year 2050 in a high-emission scenario, have a direct influence on agricultural productivity and thereby local food security. Higher heat stress combined with long-lasting and intensifying droughts induces reduced yields and comes with a higher incidence of pests and plant diseases.

Depending on the region, future climate projections show a complex variability of rainfall. The increasingly severe extreme events like floods and locally higher average precipitation will lead to a surplus of water, while generally higher temperatures along with intense droughts will make for large deficiencies. These disparities will directly impact agricultural productivity as well as the quantity and quality of goods that can be harvested.

Connected to missing or excessive rainfall patterns, soil degradation significantly reduces the fertility of land and therefore agricultural productivity causing economic losses.

In order to provide harvest efficiently, it becomes increasingly important to develop efficient water strategies for the irrigation of crops. Currently, more than half of the total irrigated agricultural area is estimated to have insufficiently maintained water infrastructure systems. Given that agricultural water demand is estimated to be rising to 52.1%, these inadequate water management conditions pose an issue and a threat to both the amount of water that can be supplied and its quality. For areas that depend heavily on irrigation systems, this is highly problematic.

In 2024, Indonesian President Joko Widodo unveiled a plan to swiftly deploy 20,000 water pumps nationwide to shield crops from extreme weather and bolster food security. The focus will be on regions that produce rice, a staple food for over 270 million Indonesians.

=== Fishery ===
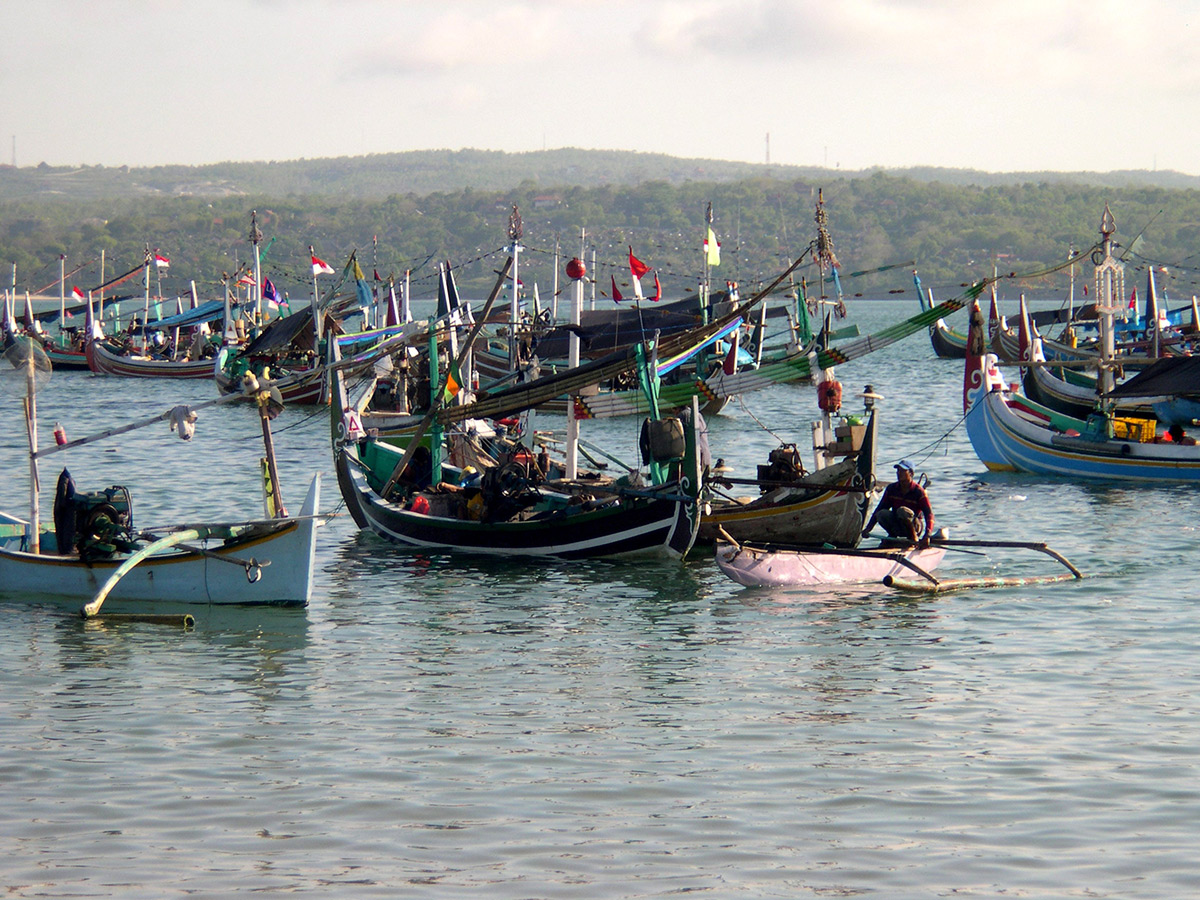
Fishermen with traditional fishing boats and gear at Jimbaran on Bali island, Indonesia

Indonesia's fishing sector contributed 2.77% of the country's GDP in 2021 and employs around 12 million people directly and indirectly. With over 5.8 million km^{2} of sea, Indonesia is home to diverse habitats such as coral reefs, mangroves, estuaries and deep sea which enables diverse fishery activity. With it comes overfishing, illegal fishing and in many places insufficient management of fishing authorization.

Due to climate change, there will be an estimated reduction of fish catch potential by around 20.3% if temperatures rise by 1.5 °C until 2050 and with warmer surroundings, the acidification of the ocean increases substantially.

In the private sector, fishing represents an important part of Indonesian culture. Traditional methods and equipment will no longer be safe or sufficient in many parts of the country given the climatic circumstances and a higher vulnerability to natural catastrophes. Therefore, the application of adaptive methods should be reinforced for sustainable small-scale fishing in order to be self-sufficient in the future. In the 2020s, seaweed farming along the coasts of Eastern Indonesia has been negatively impacted by ongoing climate change, with declines in revenue and seaweed harvests occurring as a result.

Rapid developments can be observed in the transformation process of mangrove ecosystems to aquaculture units. Having the highest coverage on the planet, the degradation and deforestation of Indonesian mangrove environments, is particularly problematic as this type of ecosystem serves as a major carbon sink and creates natural barriers protecting inland areas in case of extreme weather events.

=== Infrastructure ===
The increased frequency of flooding, heavy storm events and sea level rise are the major threats of climate change upon the infrastructure in Indonesia. Currently, sea level rise is approximately 3.9 ± 0.4 mm per year. Experts predict that before 2050, thousands of islands and houses located along coastal areas in Indonesia will disappear. A recent analysis conducted by one of Indonesia's biggest newspapers estimate 199 out of 514 cities and districts could be affected by tidal flooding by 2050. Cracking on housing, sinking, sloping of buildings and issues with drainage are examples of infrastructure problems that have been associated with flooding and subsidence. An increased frequency of heavy storms are further associated with infrastructure damage, building loss and displacement of people from their homes and jobs. Expenditure will be required to invest in flood protection strategies, re-build roads and buildings and reallocate people out of their affected area.

=== Forestry and mining ===
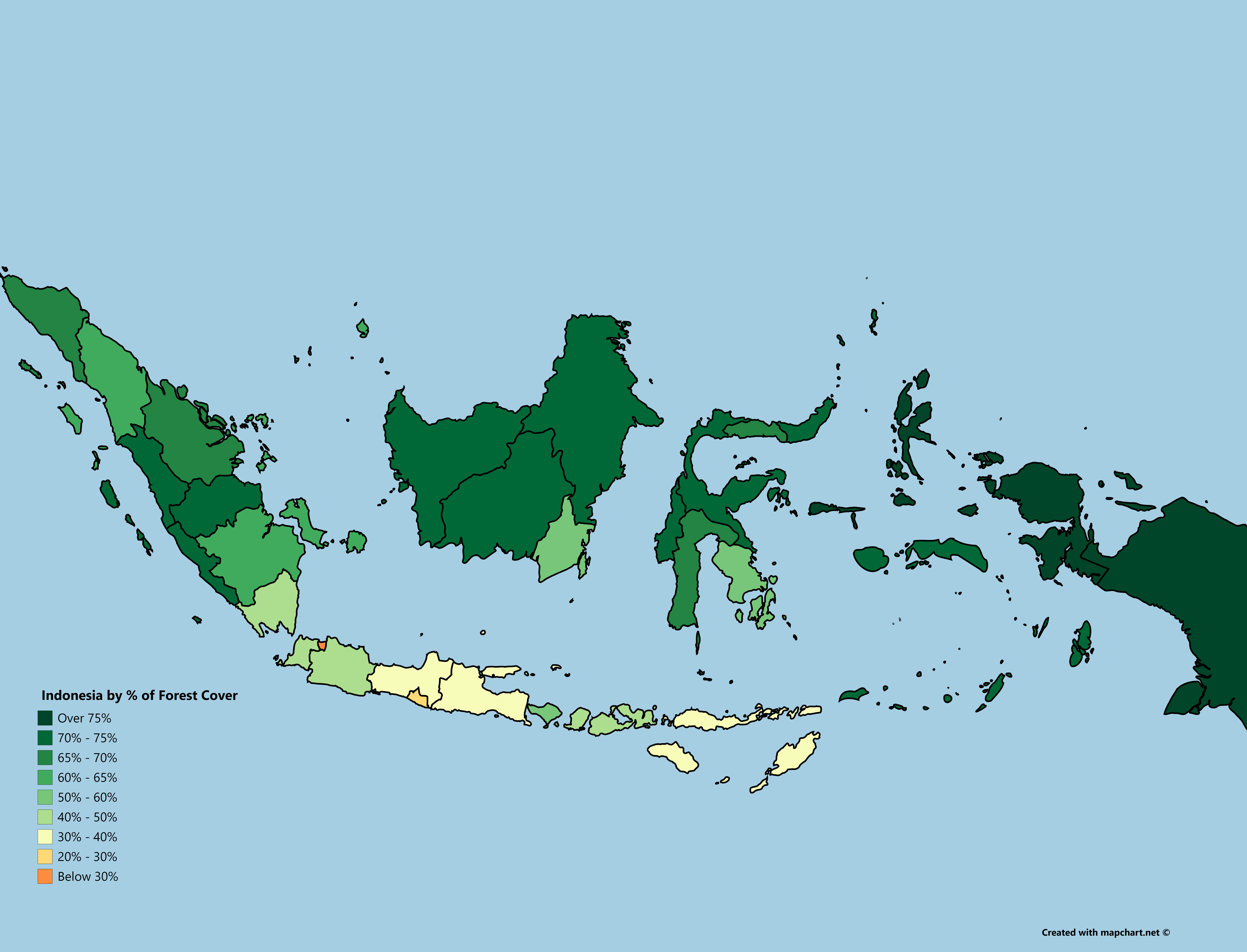
Forest Cover (%) of Indonesia

Indonesia is a country abundant in natural resources, with strong industries linked to forestry and mining. These industries have been heavily affected by climate change (temperature increase, change in precipitation patterns, forest degradation, more frequent and intense forest fire).

This in turn has had an immense impact on the environment. For example, deforestation contributes to global greenhouse gas emissions which accelerates climate change even further as well as destroys animal habitats and biodiversity. Such effects of climate change have posed a direct threat to Indonesia's forestry industry, hindering its development and limiting its potential.

Mining is an important industry in Indonesia. The country is a major producer of coal, gold, and nickel. However, it carries significant risks to the environment including water pollution, soil erosion, and deforestation. Climate change is exacerbating these risks further, with changing rainfall patterns leading to reduced water availability along with an increased risk of flooding and landslides. Additionally, deforestation and mining activities release greenhouse gases such as carbon dioxide into the atmosphere which contribute to global warming. This highlights the importance of sustainable mining and forestry practices, which minimize environmental damage while also helping to slow down climate change.

Indonesia has taken steps not only to address the interrelated issues of climate change but also the forestry and mining industries. To mitigate deforestation, the government has implemented the Indonesia Forest Moratorium and the REDD+ program, as well as regulations regarding environmental impact assessments and monitoring of mining activities. In addition, acknowledging that these industries themselves contribute to climate change, addressing these impacts requires a collaborative effort from all stakeholders (government, industry, civil society) to promote sustainable practices, reduce greenhouse gas emissions and ultimately create a more sustainable future for Indonesia.

=== Tourism and trade ===
==== Tourism ====
Tourism accounts for approximately 4% of Indonesia's total economy. Climate change is expected to impact the tourism sector in a multitude of ways. Sea level rise will limit the geographical locations of housing available to incoming tourists and disproportionally impact low-lying islands that provide tourism services. Tidung Island, Bidadari Island and Pramuka Island are examples of coastal tourism hotspots in Indonesia that might be impacted from rising sea levels. A recent study found that an increase in 1% in temperature and relative humidity is associated with a decrease in the number of international tourists in Indonesia by 1.37% and 0.59% respectively. These findings provide insight for climate change adaptation policies for policy makers and climate change experts in Indonesia. The Minister for tourism and creative economy in Indonesia has established a campaign called the 'Every Step Matters' movement that aims to reduce carbon dioxide emissions from the tourism sector by up to 50% by 2030 and to achieve zero emissions by 2045.

==== Trade ====
Trade is expected to be affected by climate change on both a local and national scale. On a local level, a potential consequence of climate change is the reduced production capacity of farms and the disruption of local transportation routes from an increased occurrence of extreme weather events. A notable example how climate change is impacting trade is through the agricultural industry in Indonesia. Rising temperatures, a change in precipitation patterns and increased occurrence of extreme weather events pose a threat to food security and crop yield, thereby impacting the efficiency of transportation systems to import and export goods, the quantity of goods that are produced and supply chain networks. On a national level, the increased frequency of weather events such as floods and heavy storms has the potential to disrupt supply chain networks, increase delays and costs of goods and overall reduce the efficiency of trading systems.

==== Health impacts ====
The effect of climate change can also be seen in the health of people in Indonesia (heat-related illnesses, respiratory disease, vector-borne disease, waterborne disease, malnutrition). There have been several studies, which show the correlation between the effect of climate change on health issues like the respiratory system, malaria transmission, and increased risk of vector-borne disease. Other factors like bad water and air quality, and malnutrition are other indirect effects that climate change has on people's health.

Collectively, these studies demonstrate that urgent action is necessary both to limit further damage from climate change and to adapt current public health strategies accordingly.

== Mitigation and adaptation ==
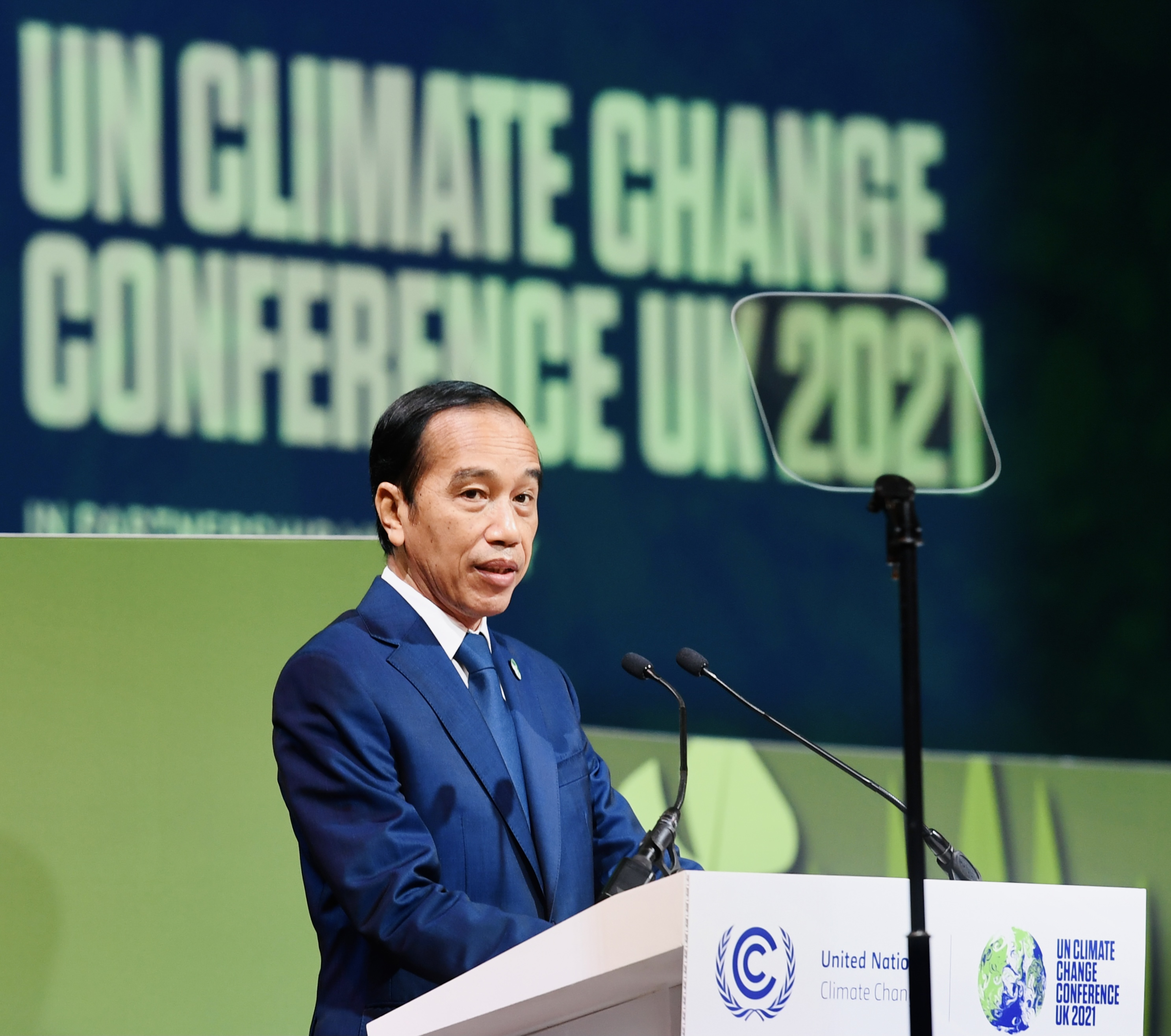
President Joko Widodo at the 2021 United Nations Climate Change Conference.

=== Policies and legislation ===
Indonesia has committed to reducing their greenhouse gas emissions since the Conference of Parties (COP) 15 of 2009, more commonly known as the Copenhagen Summit. Regarding mitigation approaches, Indonesia has pledged to reduce their own greenhouse emissions by 26% and by 41% with the help from external international assistance by 2020. Indonesia has established a payment for ecosystem services (PES) to encourage the uptake of climate friendly practices. The program aims to focus on assisting local and rural communities to encourage sustainable agricultural practices. Offering monetary incentives to farmers helps to build resilience in the landscape and reduces the chance of soil erosion, forest fires and landslides. The government implemented a moratorium first issued in 2011 on forest clearing permits, this policy has been labeled as 'propaganda' and activists are skeptical that the new moratorium will do much to reduce the rate of deforestation. Indonesia has established a forest conservation program that aims to establish a number of protected national parks, wildlife reserves and forest conservation areas. In 2015, the Indonesian government submitted its Intended Nationally Determined Contributions (INDCs) to the United Nations Framework Convention on Climate Change (UNFCCC). Indonesia's INDC outlined its commitment to reducing greenhouse gas emissions by 29% by 2030, compared to business-as-usual emissions. On a state level, Indonesia is implementing policies such as feed-in tariffs for renewable energy producers, tax incentives for renewable energy project and the development of a geothermal power plant to achieve these targets. Indonesia’s coastal adaptation and marine-resource financing initiatives have included “Ocean20” and “Blue Halo S”, with implementation partners including Konservasi Indonesia and Conservation International and support from the Green Climate Fund.

=== Finance ===
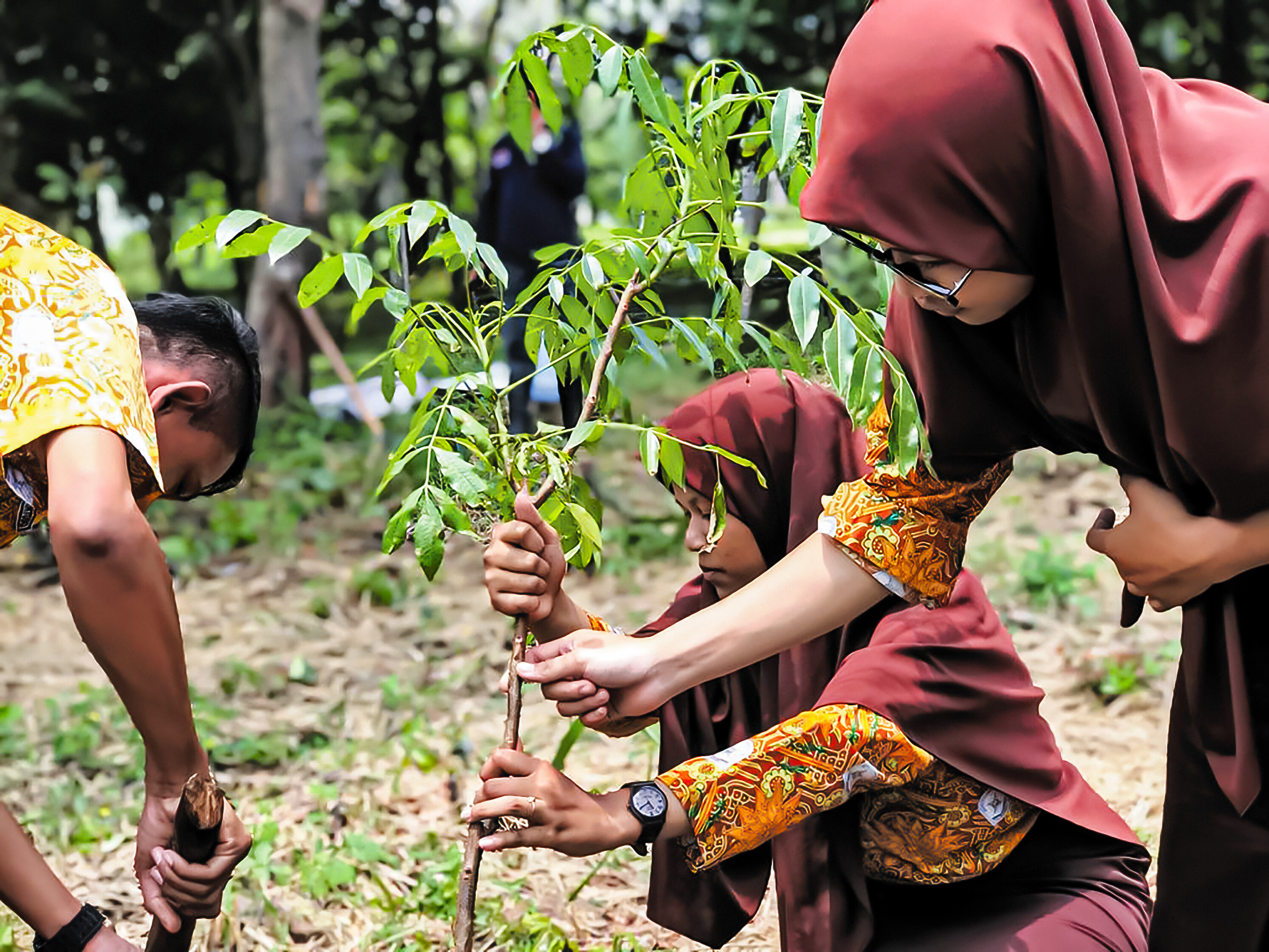
Students in East Java province planting trees as part of Earth Day 2022.

Climate finance in Indonesia refers to financial resources earmarked to support climate change mitigation and adaptation actions in the country. As the fifth largest emitter of greenhouse gases in the world, a position attributed mainly to deforestation (loss of 60,000 km² of primary forests between 2000 and 2012) and dependence on fossil fuels (85% of the energy matrix in 2023), Indonesia is simultaneously a key actor in the global climate crisis and one of the countries most vulnerable to its impacts, such as rising sea levels and intensifying natural disasters.

Financing mechanisms range from international standards such as REDD+ and carbon markets to innovative instruments such as green sukuk (Islamic green bonds) and green waqf (religious conservation endowments). However, historical challenges – such as land centralization inherited from the colonial period, conflicts between customary rights (adat) and state legislation, and subsidies to polluting sectors – complicate the efficient allocation of resources. Between 2011 and 2023, the country raised US$78 billion for energy transition and forest conservation, but critics point to gaps in governance and equitable distribution of benefits.

=== Paris Agreement ===
Indonesia is a signatory to the Paris agreement, committing to reducing global greenhouse gas emissions by 29% by 2030. They have further agreed to reduce greenhouse gas emissions from deforestation and forest degradation by 90% by 2030, this also includes restoring 12 million hectares of degraded peatlands and forest. They are committed to transitioning to greener energy sources, aiming to increase its mix of renewable energy sources to 23% by 2025 and 31% by 2030. However, Indonesia is still a long way from achieving these targets. Indonesia has taken some action in reducing greenhouse gas emissions from deforestation and peatland areas through establishing a One Map policy to improve monitoring and conflict resolutions between stakeholders. According to the Global Forest Watch, Indonesia lost 4.3 million hectares of tree cover between 2001 and 2020. Regarding Indonesia's progress in adopting renewable energy courses, their renewable energy mix was 9.8% in 2015 and increased to 11.2% in 2020. Regarding national greenhouse emissions, Indonesia emitted 602.6 million tonnes of carbon dioxide into the atmosphere in 2021, making it one of the largest greenhouse gas emitters of a developing nation. Although Indonesia has made progress decreasing its greenhouse gas emissions, extra assistance and work is required to meet its 2030 target.

== Society and culture ==
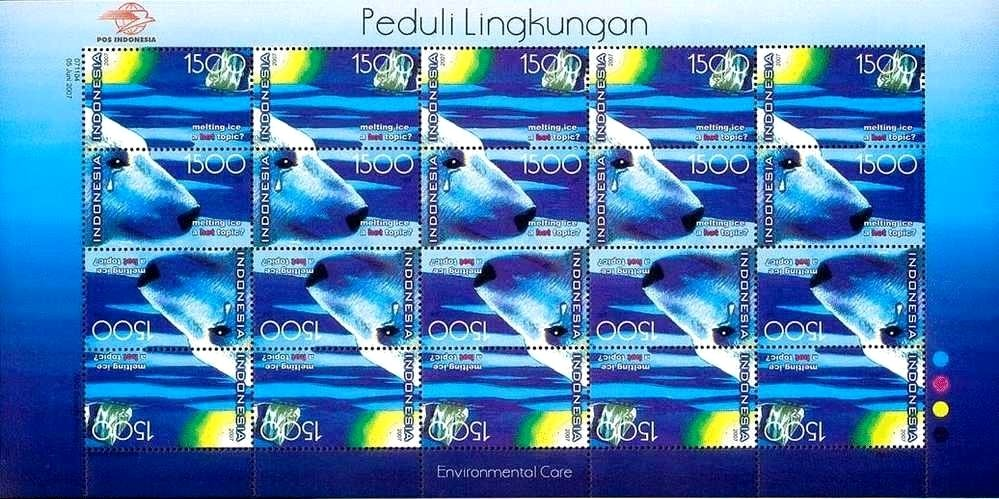
A 2007 Indonesian postage stamp, featuring climate change.

A 2019 survey by YouGov and the University of Cambridge concluded that at 18%, Indonesia has "the biggest percentage of climate deniers, followed by Saudi Arabia (16 percent) and the U.S. (13 percent)."

Climate education is not a part of the school curriculum.

== See also ==
- Flooding in Jakarta
- Climate of Indonesia
- Environment of Indonesia
- Environmental issues in Indonesia
- Energy in Indonesia
- Regional effects of global warming
- Climate change in Papua New Guinea
- Climate change in Malaysia
