= Environment of Indonesia =

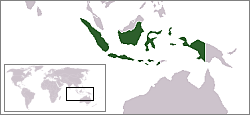
Indonesia is a transcontinental country in Southeast Asia and Oceania.

The environment of Indonesia consists of 17,508 islands scattered over both sides of the equator. Indonesia's size, tropical climate, and archipelagic geography, support the world's second highest level of biodiversity after Brazil.

== Issues ==
Indonesia's large and growing population and rapid industrialisation present serious environmental issues, which are often given a lower priority due to high poverty levels and weak, under-resourced governance. Issues include large-scale deforestation (much of it illegal) and related wildfires causing heavy smog over parts of western Indonesia, Malaysia and Singapore; over-exploitation of marine resources; and environmental problems associated with rapid urbanisation and economic development, including air pollution, traffic congestion, garbage management, and reliable water and waste water services. Deforestation and the destruction of peatlands make Indonesia the world's third largest emitter of greenhouse gases. Habitat destruction threatens the survival of indigenous and endemic species, including 140 species of mammals identified by the World Conservation Union (IUCN) as threatened, and 15 identified as critically endangered, including the Sumatran Orangutan.

Indonesia has a below average but slightly improving performance in the global Environmental Performance Index (EPI) with an overall ranking of 107 out of 180 countries in 2016. This is also below average in the Asia Pacific region, behind Thailand but slightly ahead of China. The EPI was established in 2001 by the World Economic Forum as a global gauge to measure how well individual countries perform in implementing the United Nations' Sustainable Development Goals. The environmental areas where Indonesia performs worst (ie. highest ranking) are water resource management (128), environmental effects of fisheries (127) and forest management (109), followed closely by sanitation. Waste water treatment plans are expected to improve conditions a bit in the future. Indonesia performs best (ie. lowest ranking) in the area of climate and energy (41), mostly due to the excellent access to electricity, less so for carbon dioxide emissions levels from power production. Health impacts of environmental issues (78) and biodiversity and habitat (83) also ranks above average.

=== Climate Change ===
Indonesia is at serious risk from the projected effects of climate change. If emissions are not reduced, it is predicted that it will see an average temperature rise of around 1 °C by the middle of the century, 0.3 °C per decade. This amounts to almost double the frequency of extremely hot days (with temperatures above 35 °C (95 °F)) per year by 2030, a figure which is predicted to rise to nearly one in three days by the end of the century. Rising temperatures risk increasing the frequency and severity of drought and food shortages, as it will have (and has already had) a serious impact on precipitation and the patterns of wet and dry seasons upon which the Indonesian agricultural system is based. It will also encourage diseases, such as dengue fever and malaria, and increases in wild-fires, which threaten the huge areas of rainforest in the country.

Climate change is having, and will continue to have, a serious impact in the form of rising sea levels. As Indonesia is the world’s largest archipelago state, at current rates, rising sea levels will leave 42 million Indonesian households in over 2000 islands at risk of submersion by the middle of this century. Over 60% of Indonesia’s population live in low-lying coastal areas, including Jakarta, which is particularly at risk, as 40% of the city is below sea-level and is rapidly subsiding, putting a huge number of people at risk of displacement.

All of this is likely to affect poorer communities the most. Over 50% of the population of Indonesia live on less than US$2 per day, and the poor will bear the brunt of the disastrous effects of climate change, including death, illness and displacement, “as they are typically the most vulnerable to the impacts of drought, floods, and landslides; and pursue livelihoods that are highly dependent on climate-sensitive sectors (i.e fisheries and forestry)”

=== Deforestation ===
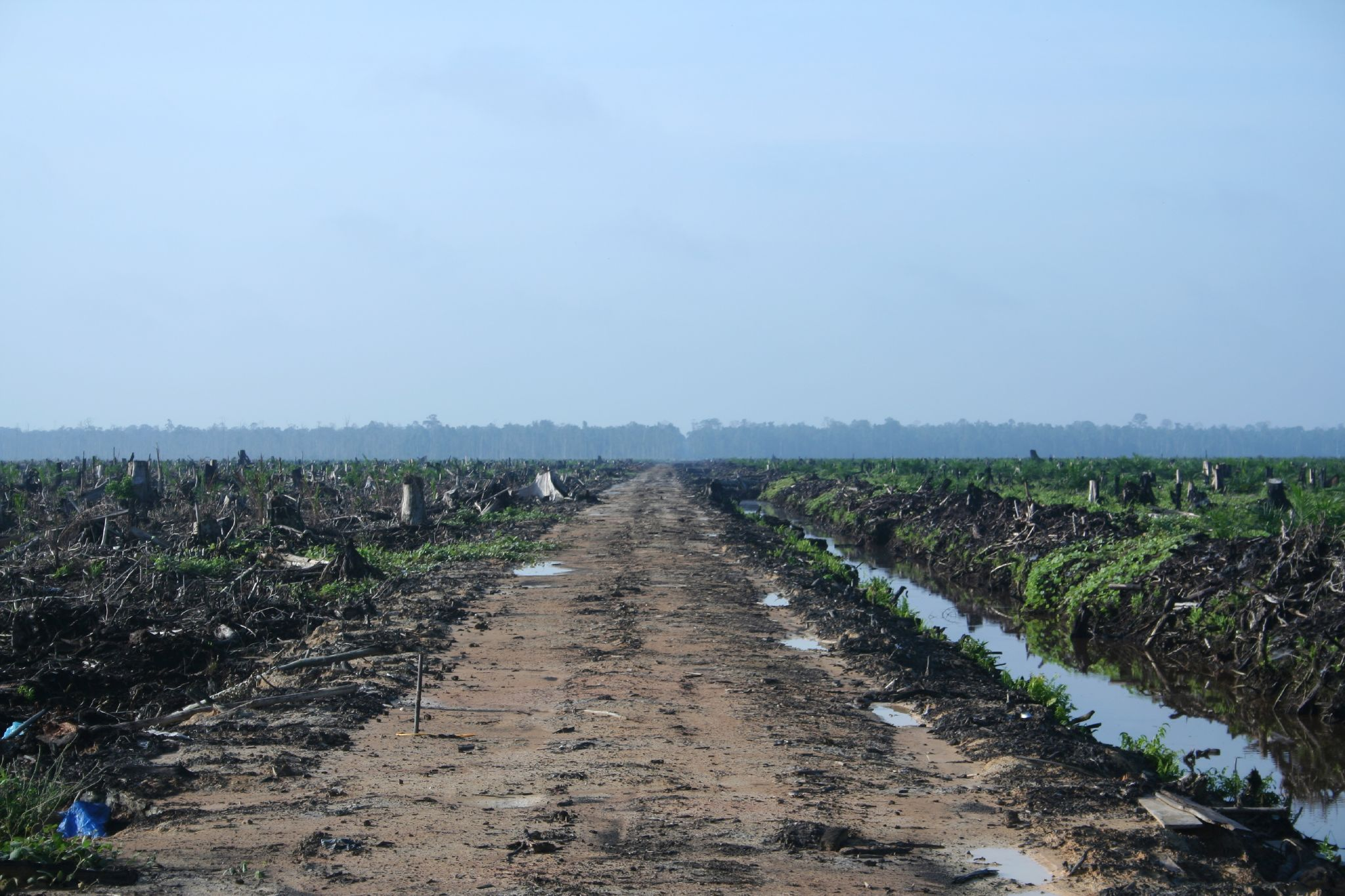
Deforestation in Riau province, Sumatra, to make way for an oil palm plantation (2007).

Deforestation in Indonesia involves the long-term loss of forests and foliage across much of the country; it has had massive environmental and social impacts. Indonesia is home to some of the most biologically diverse forests in the world and ranks third in number of species behind Brazil and the Democratic Republic of Congo.

As late as 1900, Indonesia was still a densely forested country: forests represented 84 percent of the total land area. Deforestation intensified in the 1970s and has accelerated further since then. The estimated forest cover of 170 million hectares around 1900 decreased to less than 100 million hectares by the end of the 20th century. In 2008, it was estimated that tropical rainforests in Indonesia would be logged out in a decade. Of the total logging in Indonesia, up to 80% is reported to be performed illegally.

Large areas of forest in Indonesia have been cleared by large multinational pulp companies, such as Asia Pulp and Paper, and replaced by plantations. Forests are often burned by farmers and plantation owners. Another major source of deforestation is the logging industry, driven by demand from China and Japan. Agricultural development and transmigration programs moved large populations into rainforest areas, further increasing deforestation rates. The widespread deforestation (and other environmental destruction) in Indonesia is often described by academics as an ecocide.

Logging and the burning of forests to clear land for cultivation have historically made Indonesia one of the world's largest emitters of greenhouse gases, behind China and the United States. Forest fires often destroy major carbon sinks, including old-growth rainforest and peat swamp forests. In May 2011, Indonesia declared a moratorium on new logging contracts to help address deforestation. The policy initially had limited impact, and by 2012 Indonesia had surpassed Brazil’s deforestation rate, becoming the world’s fastest forest-clearing nation.

In recent years, however, deforestation rates have declined. According to 2025 data from the University of Maryland’s Global Land Analysis and Discovery (GLAD) Lab, Indonesia reduced primary forest loss by 11% from 2023 to 2024, reversing a steady increase seen between 2021 and 2023. Fires remained relatively mild, and total loss stayed well below the peaks recorded in the mid-2010s. The final year of President Joko Widodo’s administration saw continued emphasis on forest protection, restoration, and fire prevention, supported by government programs, local community initiatives, and private-sector efforts to reduce deforestation linked to commodities such as palm oil and timber. Most primary forest loss occurred near existing plantations, small-scale farms, and mining areas; with localized increases reported in several provinces, including Aceh, Bengkulu, and South Sumatra on Sumatra, as well as in Papua. Losses were also observed within protected areas such as Kerinci Seblat, Tesso Nilo, and the Leuser ecosystem.

In 2025, forest loss in Indonesia surged by 66%, reaching its highest rate in eight years.

== Environmental policy and law ==
=== Treaties and international agreements ===
Indonesia is a signatory to a number of treaties and international agreements:

- Party to - Biodiversity, Climate Change, Desertification, Endangered Species, Hazardous Wastes, Law of the Sea, Nuclear Test Ban, Ozone Layer Protection, Ship Pollution, Tropical Timber 83, Tropical Timber 94, Wetlands
- Signed, and ratified - Climate Change-Kyoto Protocol
- Signed, but not ratified - Marine Life Conservations

=== Domestic environmental policy ===
In 2020, the rate of deforestation in Indonesia was the slowest since 1990. It was 75% lower than in 2019. This is because the government stopped issuing new licenses to cut forests, including for palm oil plantations. The falling price of palm oil facilitated this reduction. Very wet weather reduced wildfires, contributing further to this achievement.

== See also ==
- Agricultural Involution: The Processes of Ecological Change in Indonesia (book)
- Biodiversity of Borneo
- Environmental issues in Indonesia
- Greenlifestyle
- Mangroves of the Straits of Malacca
- Fauna of Indonesia
- Flora of Indonesia
- Climate of Indonesia
- Geography of Indonesia
- Protected areas of Indonesia
- List of ecoregions in Indonesia
