= Climate of Indonesia =

Köppen-Geiger climate classification map for Indonesia

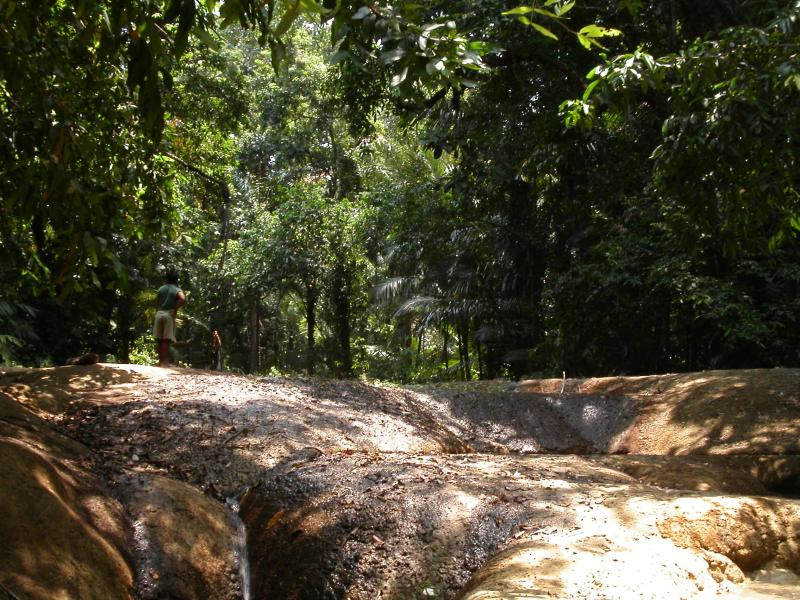
Ujung Kulon National Park, Banten

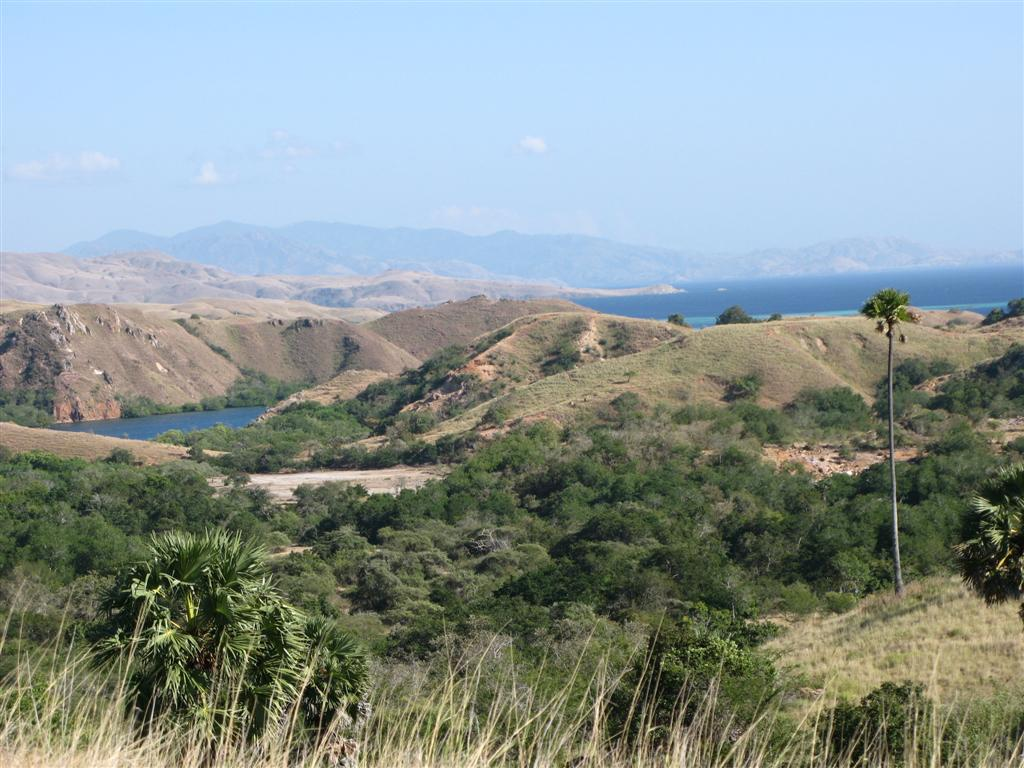
Rinca, Lesser Sunda Islands

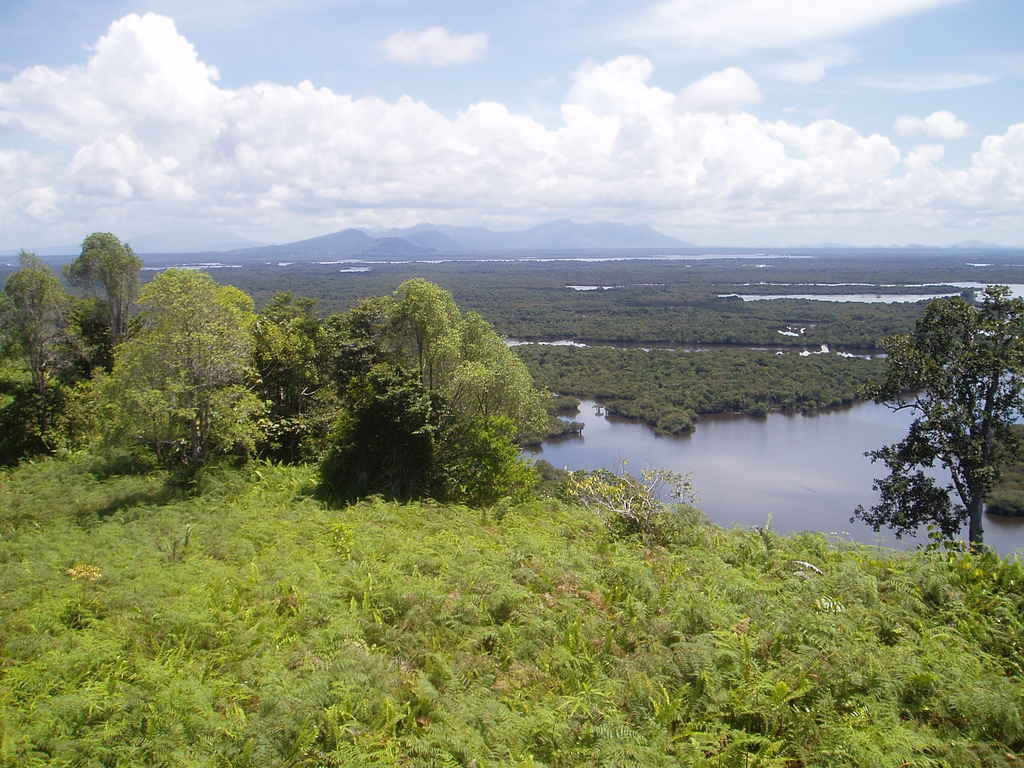
Danau Sentarum National Park, West Kalimantan

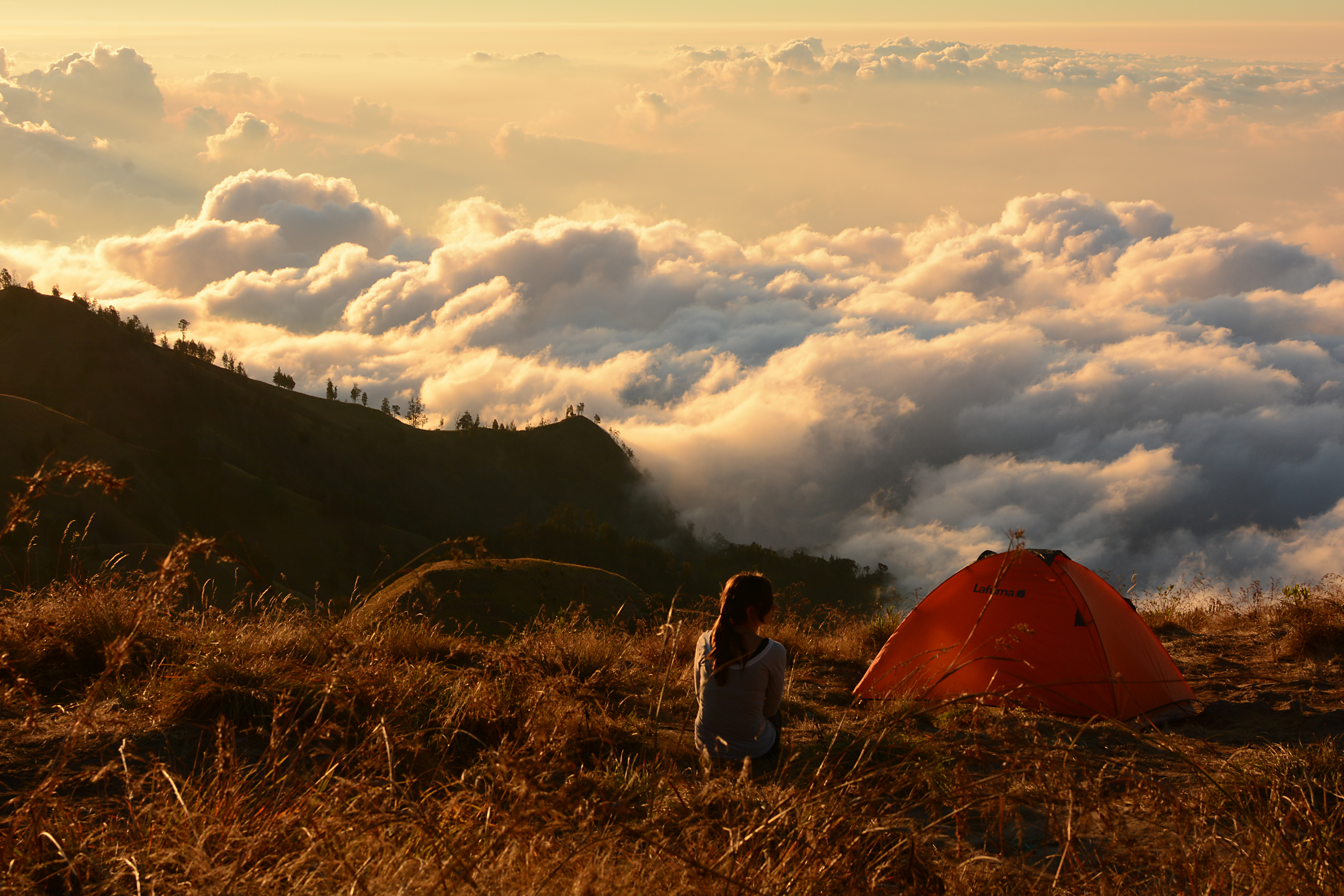
Mount Rinjani summit

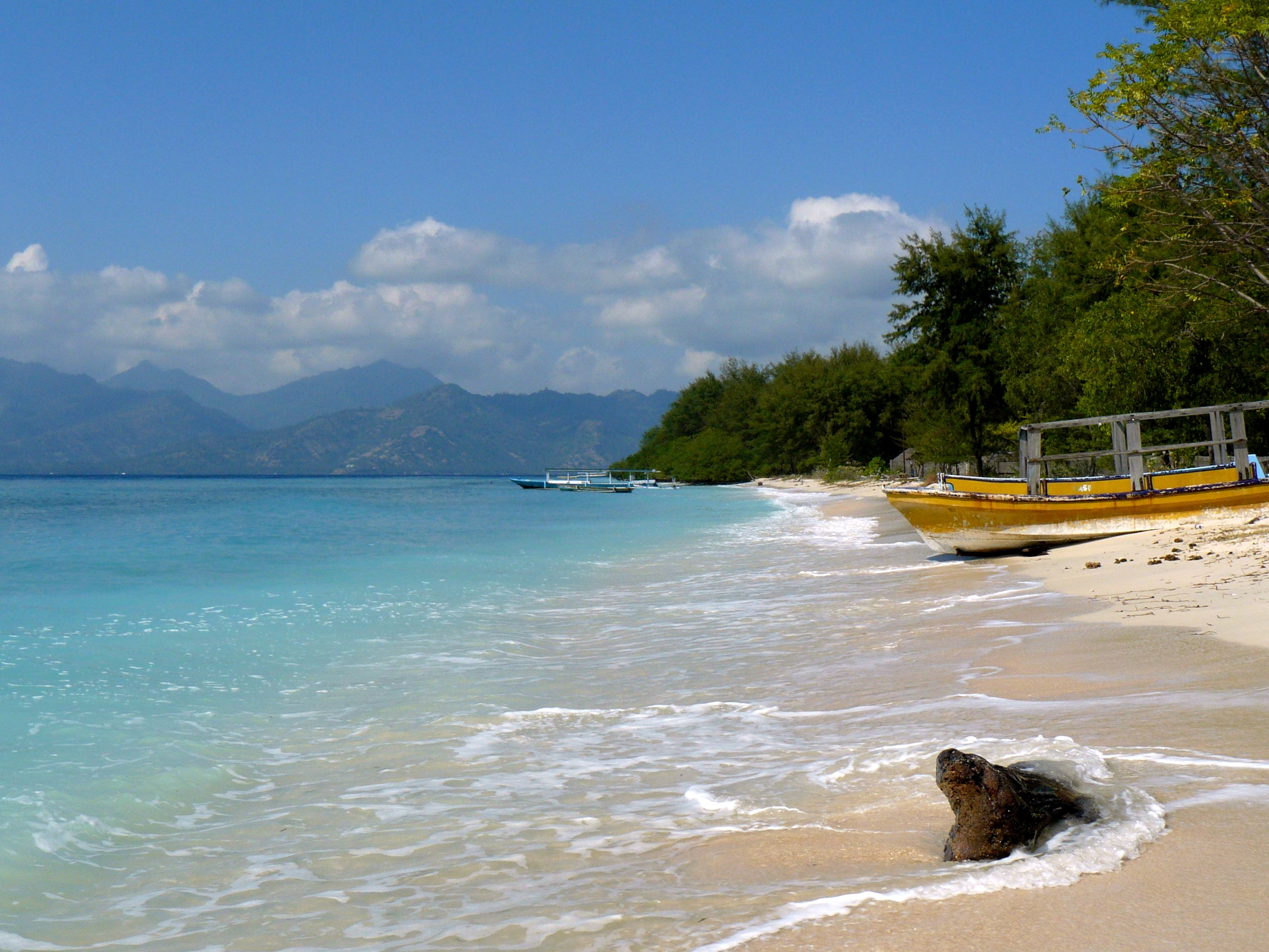
Gili Meno Beach, Lombok

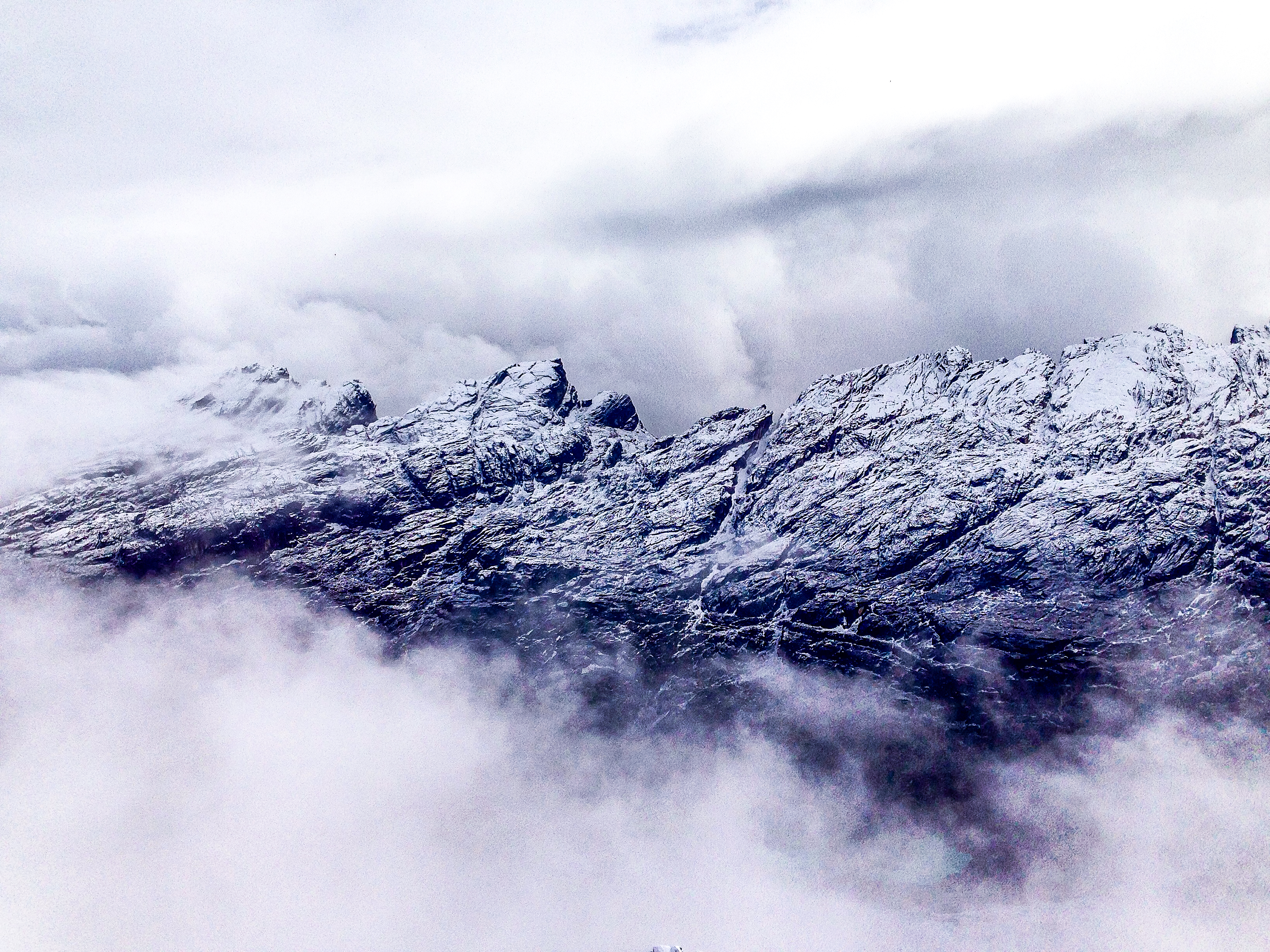
Puncak Jaya region icecap, Papua

The climate of Indonesia is almost entirely tropical. The uniformly warm waters that make up 81% of Indonesia's area ensure that temperatures on land remain fairly constant, with the coastal plains averaging 28 °C (82 °F), the inland and mountain areas averaging 26 °C (79 °F), and the higher mountain regions averaging 23 °C (73 °F). Temperature varies little from season to season, and Indonesia experiences relatively little change in the length of daylight hours from one season to the next; the difference between the longest day and the shortest day of the year is only forty-eight minutes. This allows crops to be grown all year round.

The main variable of Indonesia's climate is not temperature or air pressure, but rainfall. The area's relative humidity ranges between 70 and 90%. Winds are moderate and generally predictable, with monsoons usually blowing in from the south and east in June through September and from the northwest in December through March. Typhoons and large-scale storms pose little hazard to mariners in Indonesian waters; the major danger comes from swift currents in channels, such as the Lombok and Sape straits.

Indonesia experiences a number of climates, mostly tropical rainforest (highest precipitation), followed by tropical monsoon and tropical savanna (lowest precipitation). (Note: The tropical monsoon climate predominantly lies along Java's coastal north, Sulawesi's coastal south and east, and Bali, while the tropical savanna climate lies in isolated parts of Central Java, lowland East Java, coastal southern Papua and smaller islands to the east of Lombok.) However, oceanic climates and subtropical highland climates are found in a number of high-altitude regions in Indonesia, mostly between 1,500 and 3,500 metres (4,900 and 11,500 ft) above sea level. Regions that are above this level (mostly in the Papuan highlands) fall into the tundra climate category and the subpolar oceanic category.

== Monsoons ==
The extreme variations in rainfall are linked with the Australian-Indonesian monsoons. Generally speaking, there is a dry season (April to September), caused by Australian continental air masses, and a rainy season (October to March), caused by air masses in Asia and the Pacific Ocean. Local wind patterns, however, can greatly modify these general wind patterns, especially in the islands of central Maluku—Seram, Ambon, and Buru. This oscillating annual pattern of wind and rain is related to Indonesia's geographical location as an isthmus between two large continents. In September and May, high pressure over the Gobi desert moves winds from that continent toward the northwest. As the winds reach the equator, the Earth's rotation causes them to veer off their original course in a northeasterly direction toward the Southeast Asian mainland. During January and February, a corresponding low pressure system over Asia causes the pattern to reverse. The result is a monsoon which is augmented by humid breezes from the Indian Ocean, producing significant amounts of rain throughout many parts of the Malay Archipelago. See also monsoon trough.

== Prevailing winds ==
Prevailing wind patterns interact with local topographic conditions to produce significant variations in rainfall throughout the archipelago. In general, western and northern parts of Indonesia experience the most precipitation, since the north- and westward-moving monsoon clouds are heavy with moisture by the time they reach these more distant regions. Western Sumatra, Java, Bali, the interiors of Kalimantan, Sulawesi, and Papua are the most predictably damp regions of Indonesia, with rainfall measuring more than 2,000 millimeters (78.7 in) per year. In part, this moisture originates on high mountain peaks that trap damp air. The city of Bogor, near Jakarta, lays claim to having the world's highest number of thunderstorm days per year—322. On the other hand, the islands closest to Australia—including Nusa Tenggara and the eastern tip of Java—tend to be dry, with some areas experiencing less than 1,000 millimeters (39.4 in) per year. To complicate the situation, some of the islands of the southern Malukus experience highly unpredictable rainfall patterns, depending on local wind currents.

== Temperature ==
Although air temperature changes little from season to season or from one region to the next, cooler temperatures prevail at higher elevations. In general, temperatures drop approximately 1 °C per 90-meter increase in elevation from sea level with some high-altitude interior mountain regions experiencing night frosts. The highest mountain ranges in Papua are permanently capped with snow.

Climate data for Jakarta, Indonesia (temperature: 1924–1994, precipitation: 1931–1994)
Month	Jan	Feb	Mar	Apr	May	Jun	Jul	Aug	Sep	Oct	Nov	Dec	Year
Record high °C (°F)	33.3 (91.9)	32.8 (91.0)	33.3 (91.9)	33.3 (91.9)	33.3 (91.9)	33.3 (91.9)	34.4 (93.9)	35.6 (96.1)	35.6 (96.1)	35.6 (96.1)	35.6 (96.1)	33.9 (93.0)	35.6 (96.1)
Mean daily maximum °C (°F)	28.9 (84.0)	28.9 (84.0)	29.4 (84.9)	30.0 (86.0)	30.6 (87.1)	30.0 (86.0)	30.0 (86.0)	30.6 (87.1)	31.1 (88.0)	31.1 (88.0)	30.6 (87.1)	29.4 (84.9)	30.1 (86.2)
Daily mean °C (°F)	26.1 (79.0)	26.1 (79.0)	26.4 (79.5)	27.0 (80.6)	27.2 (81.0)	26.7 (80.1)	26.4 (79.5)	26.7 (80.1)	27.0 (80.6)	27.2 (81.0)	27.0 (80.6)	26.4 (79.5)	26.7 (80.1)
Mean daily minimum °C (°F)	23.3 (73.9)	23.3 (73.9)	23.3 (73.9)	23.9 (75.0)	23.9 (75.0)	23.3 (73.9)	22.8 (73.0)	22.8 (73.0)	22.8 (73.0)	23.3 (73.9)	23.3 (73.9)	23.3 (73.9)	23.3 (73.9)
Record low °C (°F)	20.6 (69.1)	20.6 (69.1)	20.6 (69.1)	20.6 (69.1)	21.1 (70.0)	19.4 (66.9)	19.4 (66.9)	19.4 (66.9)	18.9 (66.0)	20.6 (69.1)	20.0 (68.0)	19.4 (66.9)	18.9 (66.0)
Average rainfall mm (inches)	300.7 (11.84)	294.7 (11.60)	210.8 (8.30)	147.3 (5.80)	132.1 (5.20)	96.5 (3.80)	63.5 (2.50)	43.2 (1.70)	66.0 (2.60)	110.8 (4.36)	142.2 (5.60)	208.2 (8.20)	1,816 (71.5)
Average rainy days	24	23	19	15	12	9	6	5	6	10	14	18	161
Average relative humidity (%)	85	85	83	82	82	81	78	76	75	77	81	82	81
Mean monthly sunshine hours	189	182	239	255	260	255	282	295	288	279	231	220	2,975
Source 1: Sistema de Clasificación Bioclimática Mundial
Source 2: Danish Meteorological Institute (humidity and sun only)

Climate data for Palembang
Month	Jan	Feb	Mar	Apr	May	Jun	Jul	Aug	Sep	Oct	Nov	Dec	Year
Mean daily maximum °C (°F)	30.8 (87.4)	31.2 (88.2)	31.5 (88.7)	32.1 (89.8)	32.4 (90.3)	31.9 (89.4)	31.8 (89.2)	32.1 (89.8)	32.5 (90.5)	32.6 (90.7)	31.9 (89.4)	31.1 (88.0)	31.8 (89.3)
Daily mean °C (°F)	26.8 (80.2)	27.1 (80.8)	27.2 (81.0)	27.7 (81.9)	28.0 (82.4)	27.4 (81.3)	27.0 (80.6)	27.2 (81.0)	27.5 (81.5)	27.7 (81.9)	27.4 (81.3)	27.0 (80.6)	27.3 (81.2)
Mean daily minimum °C (°F)	22.9 (73.2)	23.0 (73.4)	23.0 (73.4)	23.4 (74.1)	23.6 (74.5)	22.9 (73.2)	22.3 (72.1)	22.4 (72.3)	22.5 (72.5)	22.9 (73.2)	23.0 (73.4)	23.0 (73.4)	22.9 (73.2)
Average rainfall mm (inches)	277 (10.9)	262 (10.3)	329 (13.0)	263 (10.4)	213 (8.4)	122 (4.8)	104 (4.1)	107 (4.2)	120 (4.7)	186 (7.3)	274 (10.8)	366 (14.4)	2,623 (103.3)
Mean monthly sunshine hours	169	118	130	150	174	127	131	149	118	160	132	120	1,678
Source 1: Climate-Data.org
Source 2: Deutscher Wetterdienst

Climate data for Dieng Plateau (2062 m)
Month	Jan	Feb	Mar	Apr	May	Jun	Jul	Aug	Sep	Oct	Nov	Dec	Year
Mean daily maximum °C (°F)	17.9 (64.2)	18.5 (65.3)	18.6 (65.5)	18.4 (65.1)	18.5 (65.3)	18.5 (65.3)	18.2 (64.8)	18.0 (64.4)	18.5 (65.3)	18.8 (65.8)	19.2 (66.6)	18.8 (65.8)	18.5 (65.3)
Daily mean °C (°F)	13.9 (57.0)	14.3 (57.7)	14.4 (57.9)	14.4 (57.9)	14.3 (57.7)	13.8 (56.8)	13.2 (55.8)	12.8 (55.0)	13.6 (56.5)	14.2 (57.6)	14.7 (58.5)	14.4 (57.9)	14.0 (57.2)
Mean daily minimum °C (°F)	10.0 (50.0)	10.1 (50.2)	10.3 (50.5)	10.4 (50.7)	10.1 (50.2)	9.2 (48.6)	8.3 (46.9)	7.6 (45.7)	8.7 (47.7)	9.6 (49.3)	10.3 (50.5)	10.1 (50.2)	9.6 (49.2)
Average precipitation mm (inches)	370 (14.6)	430 (16.9)	434 (17.1)	249 (9.8)	153 (6.0)	83 (3.3)	53 (2.1)	35 (1.4)	57 (2.2)	170 (6.7)	230 (9.1)	388 (15.3)	2,652 (104.5)

Climate data for Denpasar, Bali
Month	Jan	Feb	Mar	Apr	May	Jun	Jul	Aug	Sep	Oct	Nov	Dec	Year
Mean daily maximum °C (°F)	30.8 (87.4)	31.0 (87.8)	31.2 (88.2)	31.7 (89.1)	31.5 (88.7)	30.7 (87.3)	29.9 (85.8)	30.2 (86.4)	30.9 (87.6)	31.4 (88.5)	31.6 (88.9)	31.3 (88.3)	31.0 (87.8)
Daily mean °C (°F)	26.9 (80.4)	27.0 (80.6)	27.0 (80.6)	27.1 (80.8)	26.8 (80.2)	26.0 (78.8)	25.6 (78.1)	25.8 (78.4)	26.3 (79.3)	26.9 (80.4)	27.2 (81.0)	27.2 (81.0)	26.7 (80.0)
Mean daily minimum °C (°F)	23.1 (73.6)	23.1 (73.6)	22.9 (73.2)	22.5 (72.5)	22.2 (72.0)	21.4 (70.5)	21.4 (70.5)	21.4 (70.5)	21.8 (71.2)	22.5 (72.5)	22.9 (73.2)	23.1 (73.6)	22.4 (72.2)
Average precipitation mm (inches)	323 (12.7)	251 (9.9)	199 (7.8)	89 (3.5)	86 (3.4)	75 (3.0)	67 (2.6)	47 (1.9)	46 (1.8)	117 (4.6)	162 (6.4)	279 (11.0)	1,741 (68.6)
Mean monthly sunshine hours	173.1	174.0	210.7	224.7	242.9	228.1	246.8	261.7	251.3	252.5	224.4	176.4	2,666.6
Average ultraviolet index	13	13	13	13	11	9	9	12	13	13	13	13	12
Source 1:
Source 2: WeatherOnline (2000 - 2019 sunshine data)

Climate data for Pontianak
Month	Jan	Feb	Mar	Apr	May	Jun	Jul	Aug	Sep	Oct	Nov	Dec	Year
Mean daily maximum °C (°F)	30.8 (87.4)	31.8 (89.2)	31.9 (89.4)	32.0 (89.6)	32.4 (90.3)	32.3 (90.1)	31.9 (89.4)	32.2 (90.0)	32.2 (90.0)	31.8 (89.2)	31.1 (88.0)	30.8 (87.4)	31.8 (89.2)
Daily mean °C (°F)	26.9 (80.4)	27.9 (82.2)	27.7 (81.9)	27.8 (82.0)	28.1 (82.6)	28.0 (82.4)	27.5 (81.5)	27.6 (81.7)	27.9 (82.2)	27.7 (81.9)	27.3 (81.1)	27.2 (81.0)	27.6 (81.7)
Mean daily minimum °C (°F)	23.1 (73.6)	24.0 (75.2)	23.5 (74.3)	23.6 (74.5)	23.8 (74.8)	23.7 (74.7)	23.1 (73.6)	23.1 (73.6)	23.6 (74.5)	23.6 (74.5)	23.5 (74.3)	23.6 (74.5)	23.5 (74.3)
Average rainfall mm (inches)	266 (10.5)	183 (7.2)	205 (8.1)	264 (10.4)	230 (9.1)	173 (6.8)	148 (5.8)	148 (5.8)	194 (7.6)	316 (12.4)	393 (15.5)	376 (14.8)	2,896 (114)
Average rainy days	18	15	17	20	18	14	13	13	16	20	21	20	205
Average relative humidity (%)	88	87	87	89	87	85	83	81	86	89	91	89	87
Mean daily sunshine hours	8.1	8.4	8.6	8.1	8.3	8.7	9.1	9.2	8.7	8.1	7.7	7.8	8.4
Source: Climate-Data.org

Climate data for Manado, North Sulawesi, Indonesia (1961–1990)
Month	Jan	Feb	Mar	Apr	May	Jun	Jul	Aug	Sep	Oct	Nov	Dec	Year
Mean daily maximum °C (°F)	29.4 (84.9)	29.5 (85.1)	30.0 (86.0)	31.4 (88.5)	31.4 (88.5)	31.2 (88.2)	31.3 (88.3)	32.0 (89.6)	32.3 (90.1)	31.7 (89.1)	30.9 (87.6)	30.1 (86.2)	30.9 (87.6)
Daily mean °C (°F)	25.4 (77.7)	25.4 (77.7)	25.7 (78.3)	26.4 (79.5)	26.4 (79.5)	26.2 (79.2)	26.1 (79.0)	26.6 (79.9)	26.4 (79.5)	26.3 (79.3)	26.3 (79.3)	25.8 (78.4)	26.1 (79.0)
Mean daily minimum °C (°F)	22.3 (72.1)	22.2 (72.0)	22.3 (72.1)	22.4 (72.3)	22.4 (72.3)	22.3 (72.1)	21.8 (71.2)	21.9 (71.4)	21.2 (70.2)	21.8 (71.2)	22.3 (72.1)	22.5 (72.5)	22.1 (71.8)
Average rainfall mm (inches)	427 (16.8)	361 (14.2)	338 (13.3)	266 (10.5)	268 (10.6)	277 (10.9)	170 (6.7)	121 (4.8)	149 (5.9)	256 (10.1)	290 (11.4)	365 (14.4)	3,288 (129.6)
Mean monthly sunshine hours	129	119	155	168	168	144	176	210	179	172	157	152	1,929
Source: Deutscher Wetterdienst

Climate data for Ambon, Maluku, Indonesia (extremes: 1912–1936)
Month	Jan	Feb	Mar	Apr	May	Jun	Jul	Aug	Sep	Oct	Nov	Dec	Year
Record high °C (°F)	35.5 (95.9)	35.5 (95.9)	35.0 (95.0)	33.9 (93.0)	32.3 (90.1)	30.5 (86.9)	30.0 (86.0)	30.5 (86.9)	31.1 (88.0)	32.8 (91.0)	34.4 (93.9)	35.5 (95.9)	35.5 (95.9)
Mean daily maximum °C (°F)	31.3 (88.3)	31.4 (88.5)	31.1 (88.0)	30.7 (87.3)	29.8 (85.6)	28.5 (83.3)	27.5 (81.5)	27.8 (82.0)	29.1 (84.4)	30.3 (86.5)	31.1 (88.0)	31.5 (88.7)	30.0 (86.0)
Daily mean °C (°F)	27.0 (80.6)	27.0 (80.6)	26.9 (80.4)	26.7 (80.1)	26.4 (79.5)	25.6 (78.1)	25.0 (77.0)	25.1 (77.2)	25.7 (78.3)	26.5 (79.7)	27.0 (80.6)	27.2 (81.0)	26.3 (79.3)
Mean daily minimum °C (°F)	24.1 (75.4)	24.1 (75.4)	23.8 (74.8)	23.9 (75.0)	24.0 (75.2)	23.6 (74.5)	23.2 (73.8)	23.1 (73.6)	23.3 (73.9)	23.8 (74.8)	24.1 (75.4)	24.2 (75.6)	23.8 (74.8)
Record low °C (°F)	22.2 (72.0)	22.8 (73.0)	22.2 (72.0)	21.6 (70.9)	20.0 (68.0)	20.5 (68.9)	20.0 (68.0)	19.4 (66.9)	18.9 (66.0)	18.9 (66.0)	21.1 (70.0)	20.0 (68.0)	18.9 (66.0)
Average rainfall mm (inches)	127 (5.0)	119 (4.7)	135 (5.3)	279 (11.0)	516 (20.3)	638 (25.1)	602 (23.7)	401 (15.8)	241 (9.5)	155 (6.1)	114 (4.5)	132 (5.2)	3,459 (136.2)
Average rainy days	12	13	12	12	19	21	22	21	16	10	10	13	181
Average relative humidity (%)	79	80	83	85	87	86	85	84	83	81	80	82	83
Mean monthly sunshine hours	192	186	211	177	158	120	115	112	150	192	219	202	2,034
Source 1: Deutscher Wetterdienst
Source 2: Danish Meteorological Institute

Climate data for Tembagapura
Month	Jan	Feb	Mar	Apr	May	Jun	Jul	Aug	Sep	Oct	Nov	Dec	Year
Mean daily maximum °C (°F)	23.3 (73.9)	23.2 (73.8)	23.0 (73.4)	22.5 (72.5)	21.9 (71.4)	20.7 (69.3)	19.9 (67.8)	19.9 (67.8)	21.0 (69.8)	22.4 (72.3)	23.1 (73.6)	23.2 (73.8)	22.0 (71.6)
Daily mean °C (°F)	17.8 (64.0)	17.8 (64.0)	17.9 (64.2)	17.6 (63.7)	17.3 (63.1)	16.4 (61.5)	15.9 (60.6)	15.8 (60.4)	16.3 (61.3)	17.2 (63.0)	17.6 (63.7)	17.8 (64.0)	17.1 (62.8)
Mean daily minimum °C (°F)	12.4 (54.3)	12.5 (54.5)	12.8 (55.0)	12.7 (54.9)	12.7 (54.9)	12.2 (54.0)	11.9 (53.4)	11.7 (53.1)	11.6 (52.9)	12.0 (53.6)	12.1 (53.8)	12.5 (54.5)	12.3 (54.1)
Average precipitation mm (inches)	248 (9.8)	306 (12.0)	266 (10.5)	272 (10.7)	273 (10.7)	292 (11.5)	299 (11.8)	296 (11.7)	277 (10.9)	248 (9.8)	221 (8.7)	222 (8.7)	3,220 (126.8)
Source: Climate-Data.org

Climate data for Jayapura
Month	Jan	Feb	Mar	Apr	May	Jun	Jul	Aug	Sep	Oct	Nov	Dec	Year
Mean daily maximum °C (°F)	30.9 (87.6)	30.5 (86.9)	30.8 (87.4)	31.0 (87.8)	31.3 (88.3)	31.0 (87.8)	30.7 (87.3)	30.7 (87.3)	31.1 (88.0)	31.0 (87.8)	31.3 (88.3)	30.9 (87.6)	30.9 (87.7)
Daily mean °C (°F)	26.9 (80.4)	26.6 (79.9)	26.8 (80.2)	26.9 (80.4)	27.1 (80.8)	26.9 (80.4)	26.7 (80.1)	26.6 (79.9)	26.9 (80.4)	27.0 (80.6)	27.1 (80.8)	26.9 (80.4)	26.9 (80.4)
Mean daily minimum °C (°F)	22.9 (73.2)	22.7 (72.9)	22.9 (73.2)	22.9 (73.2)	23.0 (73.4)	22.8 (73.0)	22.7 (72.9)	22.6 (72.7)	22.8 (73.0)	23.0 (73.4)	22.9 (73.2)	22.9 (73.2)	22.8 (73.1)
Average precipitation mm (inches)	288 (11.3)	272 (10.7)	315 (12.4)	209 (8.2)	161 (6.3)	173 (6.8)	126 (5.0)	158 (6.2)	154 (6.1)	143 (5.6)	182 (7.2)	244 (9.6)	2,425 (95.4)
Source: Climate-Data.org

== See also ==
- Climate change in Indonesia
- Environment of Indonesia
- Geography of Indonesia
