= Australian monsoon =

Pattern of thunderstorms and rainfall in northern Australia

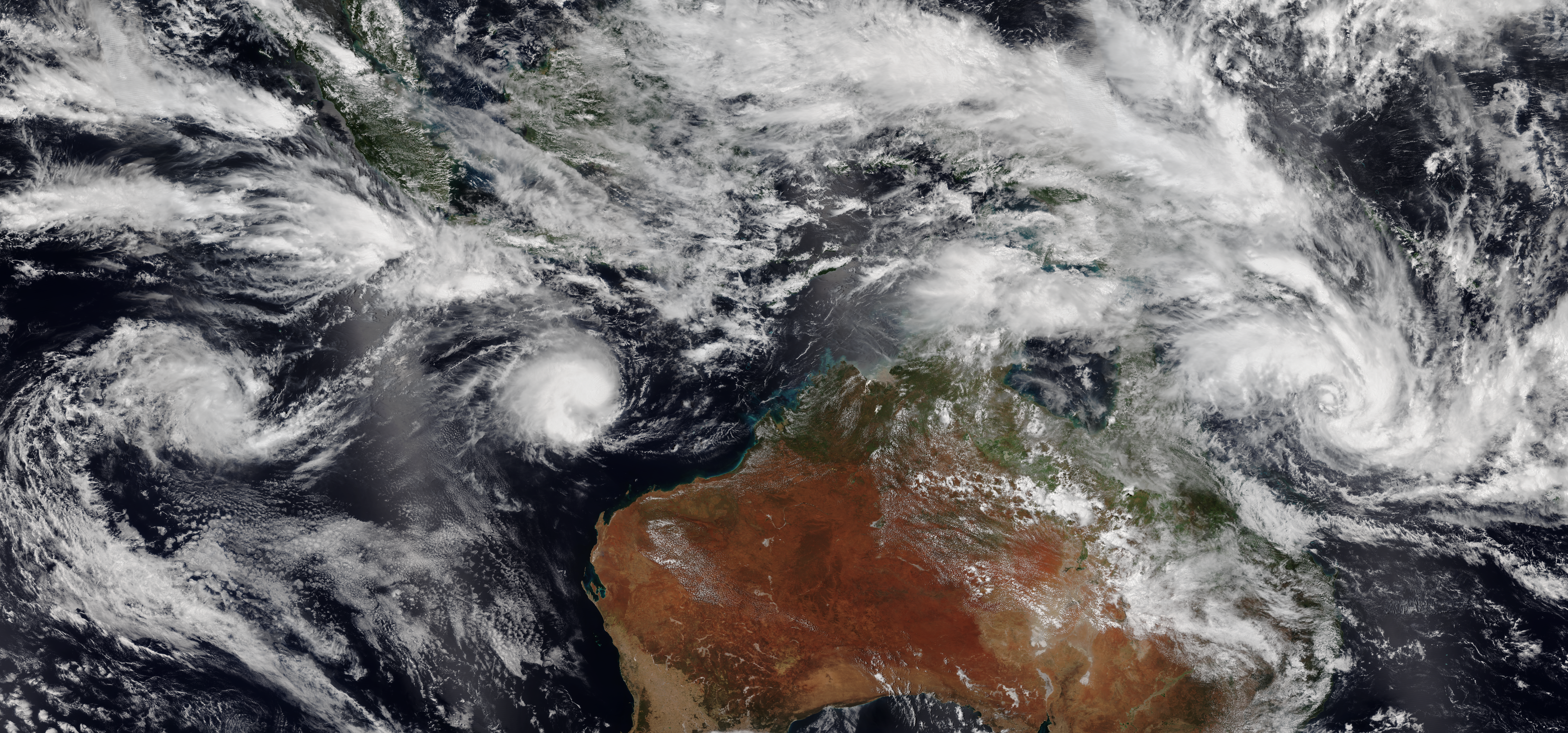
Monsoonal troughs in northern Australia in February 2023, with some developing into tropical cyclones. When the deep lows are significant, they can affect the south as well.

The Australian monsoon (AUM), also known as the Australian summer monsoon (ASM), and the Australian-Indonesian monsoon (AIM), is a monsoon system that increases thunderstorms and rainfall over many areas of Indonesia and northern Australia, from the far northern tropics of the region to the semi-arid zone of Australia, typically between November and mid-March, which is the wet season of many parts of northern Australia and Indonesia.

The origin of the Australian monsoon (AUM) is comparable to the North African monsoon, since both develop from the seasonal motion of the Intertropical Convergence Zone (ITCZ) and the connected meridional shift in the overturning Hadley circulation, which lead to a pronounced rainfall seasonality. From the end of the 19th century, the force of the Australian monsoon has been measured by the summer precipitation at Darwin.

== Mechanism ==
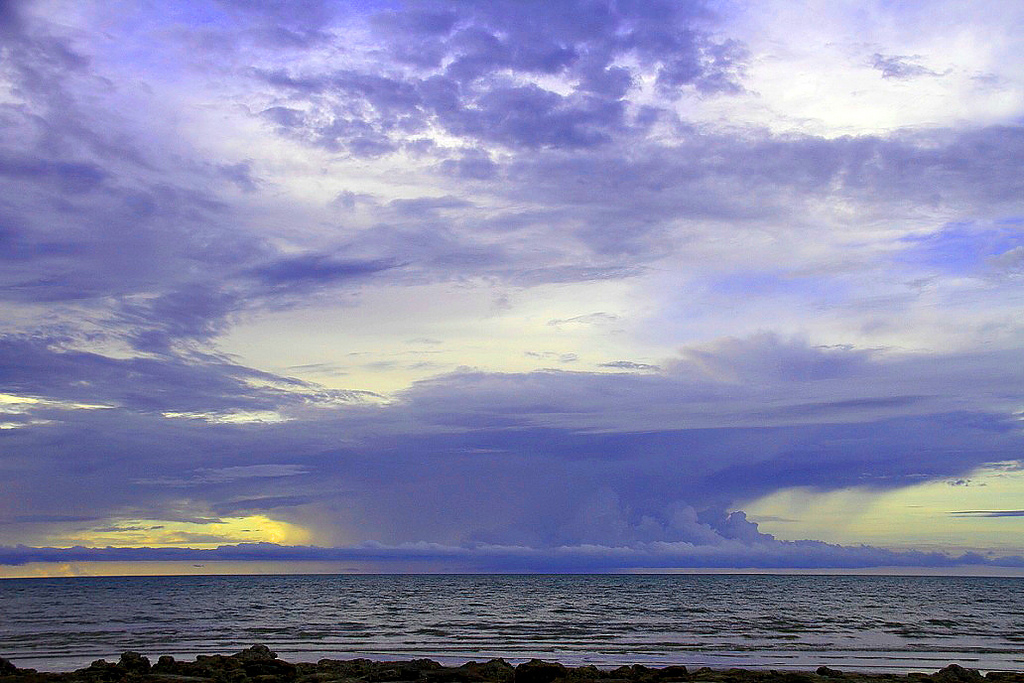
Wet season storm in Darwin

In northern Australia, the predominant wind is from the east or southeast in most occasions, which usually bring dry conditions. Though during monsoon periods (between November and April), the winds change to northwesterly, where atmospheric pressure decreases over an area extending to Java, Sumatra, Timor Sea and eastward to Papua New Guinea. When the Australian continent heats up much more rapidly than the surrounding ocean (the Timor, Banda Sea, and Arafura Sea), low pressure systems may form, which efficaciously draw in the monsoon trough (which is an area of low pressure and rising air) above the hot and dry areas of northern Australia, thereby increasing humidity prior to the rains (this is known as the "build-up"). The trough attracts moist air from the encompassing oceans and this inflow of moist air is referred to as the monsoon.

During the "active" phase or "bursts", large regions of cloud and rain are formed, where there is a constant northwesterly wind on the north area of the trough, alongside heavy rainfall on the land, which lasts from about four to eight weeks. An inactive phase or "breaks" is when the monsoon trough diminishes and withdraws to the north of Australia, although light winds, sporadic showers and thunderstorm activity may occur. Later than normal monsoon arrivals, and drier ones, are generally associated with El Niño conditions in the Pacific, while La Niña is mostly associated with an early monsoon season and wetter ones as well. The monsoon's thickness is normally less than 1,500 metres (4,900 feet) over the sea and 2,000–2,500 metres (6,600–8,200 feet) over the land.

Although the northern Australian monsoonal bursts peak between mid-November and mid-December, they can extend well into March. The Australian monsoon rainfall variability (AUMRV) has a similar ratio in rainfall over much of the country, going as far south as the southern Murray–Darling Basin. About 28% of inter-annual AUMRV is linked with oceanic irregularity in the tropical Pacific and Indian Oceans. Moreover, compared to the Asian, African and North American monsoonal regions, the AUM seems to possess the highest variation, as it is linked to El Niño–Southern Oscillation, especially over northeastern Australia.

== Effects ==
The monsoon seasons are generally associated with overcast conditions, extended periods of heavy rain, episodic thunderstorms and fresh to strong squally winds, which frequently lead to flooding in affected areas in the Northern Territory, northern Western Australia and northern Queensland. Most of the fresh water for the sparsely populated northern Australia comes from the Australian monsoonal rains.

The Australian monsoon can also have a high influence on rainfall on the southeastern seaboard during the warmer months, such as in southeast Queensland and as well as the northern half of New South Wales (Northern Rivers to metropolitan Sydney), where summer is the wettest season and winter is the driest (the precipitation contrast between the two seasons decreases farther to the south as the effect of the Australian monsoon lessens).

== See also ==
- Climate of Australia
- Climate of Indonesia
- Effects of the El Niño–Southern Oscillation in Australia
