= Greenlifestyle =

- Website type: Community
- Available in: bahasa Indonesia
- Website: http://www.greenlifestyle.or.id/
- Launched: June 2007

Greenlifestyle is a non-profit online community of urban residents in Indonesia which was established as a sharing platform to discuss relevant tips for green living in the country's cities. The community began as a mailing list in June 2007, and includes approximately 1,400 members from Banda Aceh (Western Indonesia) to Jayapura (Eastern Indonesia) as of July 2010. An ongoing focus is the exchange of practical and cost-effective green living tips and information that can be applied in Indonesia. Greenlifestyle is managed by a loose team of volunteers on a part-time basis.

== Goal ==
Greenlifestyle’s ultimate goal is to see Indonesian cities where people and companies' behavior no longer degrade the environment.

== Activities ==
Greenlifestyle facilitates the distribution of green tips, news and events-related information (and encourages information sharing by others) through electronic media and public events, and by engaging the private sector through more focused environmental actions. Between 2007 and early 2009, Greenlifestyle maintained a presence in The Jakarta Post Weekender magazine through a monthly column, ran a bi-weekly radio show on GreenRadio FM, and established a presence in Aksara book stores through strategically placed green tips.

Occasionally, Greenlifestyle volunteers participate in related events in collaboration with other non-profit organisations, e.g. encouraging the public to reduce the use of plastic bottles during outings, or raising awareness on waste issues to schoolchildren.

The community members also get together at occasional events to learn how and where to recycle paper, make compost, design a green house etc. At these events, a pooling center for recyclable plastic, bottle, paper packages and used batteries is often provided.
