= Rafflesia lawangensis =

Scientific classification
- Kingdom: Plantae
- Clade: Tracheophytes
- Clade: Angiosperms
- Clade: Eudicots
- Clade: Rosids
- Order: Malpighiales
- Family: Rafflesiaceae
- Genus: Rafflesia
- Species: R. lawangensis

Binomial name
- Rafflesia lawangensis Mat-Salleh, Mahyuni & Susatya

Species of plant

Rafflesia lawangensis is a species of parasitic plant in the genus Rafflesia. It is exclusively found in Bukit Lawang, a small tourist village in Mount Leuser National Park, North Sumatra, Indonesia. Previously misidentified as Rafflesia arnoldii, photographs taken in 2005 led to the eventual separation of Rafflesia lawangensis as a distinct species in 2010.

== Discovery ==
Rafflesia lawangensis was first described in Volume 13 of the Journal Reinwardtia in 2010. The first description was written by K. Mat-Salleh, Ridha Mahyuni, Agus Susatya, and J.F. Veldkamp. The location of Bohorok, Bukit Lawang, was previously thought to be a possible habitat for Rafflesia plants, judging by similar floristic composition to the area of Lokop. Eventually, reports of Rafflesia plants in the area of Bohorok were noted, and were erroneously referred as members of Rafflesia arnoldii. However, there was no physical material in herbariums, nor photographs taken of the plant. This was until 2005, when Ewa Kamila Grzelczak photographed an unusual Rafflesia from Bukit Lawang. The photograph was sent to the National University of Malaysia, where it was determined to be neither of the previously assumed species, but rather a new species altogether. It was one of three newly discovered species of Rafflesia found in Indonesia after the 1997 treatment of the genus in Flora Malesiana.

== Description ==
The mature male bud has a diameter of 29–30 centimetres (11–12 in). The diameter of the fully blooming female flower is between 58–63 centimetres (23–25 in). The petals of the flower, known as the perigone lobes, are 24–25 by 19–25 centimetres (9.4 in–9.8 in × 7.5 in–9.8 in). The plant is mostly dark orange to reddish brown in colour, with reddish white warts with a short and dense covering of hair. The diaphragm, an aperture at the top of the flower, is ring-shaped and has a width of 6 centimetres (2.4 in) and a diameter of 31–33 centimetres (12–13 in). The relative size of the plant's diaphragm opening is considered the widest among the species of Rafflesia found in Sumatra, at over 80% of the flower's diameter, and comparable to R. leonardi from Luzon. The pollen of R. lawangensis is larger in comparison to other larger-flowered members of the same genus such as R. keithii and R. kerrii.

Rafflesia lawangensis was misidentified as Rafflesia arnoldii var. arnoldii or Rafflesia arnoldii var atjehensis. It is similar to Rafflesia kerrii, with both plants having a very wide diaphragm, a bowl like structure at the center of the flower which opens up to the reproductive structures. It is distinct from R. arnoldii by the presence of fine hairs on the surface of the perigone lobes, the flower's "petals". The flowers of R. lawangensis are also smaller than those of R. arnoldii, and the shape and color of the warts are different. Among the Rafflesia of Sumatra, R. lawangensis is distinctive in lacking warts on the upper part of its diaphragm.

== Distribution ==
The species is known only in a single locality, Bukit Lawang, in North Sumatra's Mount Leuser National Park. The range of the plant overlaps with two other related species, R. micropylora and R. rochusenii, but can be easily distinguished from the two, in addition to other species found in Sumatra. It is a parasite of the plant Tetrastigma coriaceum.

== Etymology ==
The specific epithet refers to the type locality of R. lawangensis, Bukit Lawang.
