= Rafflesia philippensis =

Scientific classification
- Kingdom: Plantae
- Clade: Embryophytes
- Clade: Tracheophytes
- Clade: Angiosperms
- Clade: Eudicots
- Clade: Rosids
- Order: Malpighiales
- Family: Rafflesiaceae
- Genus: Rafflesia
- Species: R. philippensis

Binomial name
- Rafflesia philippensis Blanco

Synonyms
- Rafflesia banahaw Barcelona, Pelser & Cajano; Rafflesia banahawensis Madulid, Villariba-Tolentino, & Agoo

Species of flowering plant

Rafflesia philippensis is a parasitic plant species of the Rafflesiaceae family that was named by Francisco Manuel Blanco in his Flora de Filipinas in 1845. The species is known only from a mountain located between the provinces of Laguna and Quezon, Luzon where it was first discovered. Its plant host is Tetrastigma pisicarpum. This species went unnoticed since its first description by Blanco but was rediscovered in 2003 by members of the Tanggol Kalikasan, a local environment conservation group in Quezon province who first saw and photographed the open flower of this species. It was brought to the attention of Manuel S. Enverga University (MSEUF), who formed a team composed of students and faculty to document the newly discovered Rafflesia species.

== Morphology ==
The mature flower bud of R. philippensis has a diameter of around 13–16 centimeters (5.1–6.3 in). Its fully opened flower has a diameter of 29.3–32 cm (11.5–12.6 in), placing it in a group composed of other small-sized Rafflesia species such as R. manillana, R. lobata, and R. baletei, whose open flowers measure an average of 20 cm (7.9 in) in diameter. The open flower has 9–10 reddish perigone lobes measuring 9.0–10.5 cm (3.5–4.1 in) with 8–12 white oval or elongated warts fused together along the median part of the lobe. R. philippensis has a distinctive closed diaphragm, same reddish color with the perigone lobes, 3.5–4.0 cm (1.4–1.6 in) thick and measuring 12.5–13.0 cm (4.9–5.1 in) across. The diaphragm’s opening has a diameter of 5.5–6.0 cm (2.2–2.4 in) with an inner white margin lining. The diaphragm’s surface, like the perigone, is blotted with a network of white, thin, elongated and continuous warts.

== Distribution ==
The species is known to occur as a small single population within the vicinity of Mount Banahaw National Park (14°03.239 N, 121°29.214 E), a protected area located south of the Laguna-Quezon provincial boundary line, between Laguna de Bay to the north and Tayabas Bay to the south. The mountain rises to about 2,100 meters (6,900 ft) above sea level. The park has been closed to the public since 2003 to allow the forest to recover from the adverse effects of human activities in the area. The population of R. philippensis is located along a trail in Kinabuhayan, Dolores, Quezon province.

== Taxonomy ==
The taxonomy and nomenclature of this species is complex. The most recent work by Dr. Julie Barcelona and colleagues has documented that the taxon named by Blanco in the mid-19th century is indeed the same as the taxon named by her own research group and that of Dr. Domingo Madulid. Thus, the two later names, R. banahawensis and R. banahaw are synonyms of R. philippensis.
