= Rafflesia azlanii =

Scientific classification
- Kingdom: Plantae
- Clade: Tracheophytes
- Clade: Angiosperms
- Clade: Eudicots
- Clade: Rosids
- Order: Malpighiales
- Family: Rafflesiaceae
- Genus: Rafflesia
- Species: R. azlanii

Binomial name
- Rafflesia azlanii Latiff & M.Wong (2003)

Species of flowering plant

Rafflesia azlanii is a parasitic flowering plant of the genus Rafflesia, endemic to Peninsular Malaysia. It is most similar to R. cantleyi, but differs in having larger perigone blotches.

The flower was first discovered in the Royal Belum Forest Reserve in the state of Perak in 2003, and is named after the Sultan of Perak, Sultan Azlan Shah. It can be found in lowland dipterocarp forests.
