= Rafflesia meijeri =

Scientific classification
- Kingdom: Plantae
- Clade: Tracheophytes
- Clade: Angiosperms
- Clade: Eudicots
- Clade: Rosids
- Order: Malpighiales
- Family: Rafflesiaceae
- Genus: Rafflesia
- Species: R. meijeri

Binomial name
- Rafflesia meijeri Wiriadinata & Sari

Species of parasitic flowering plant

Rafflesia meijeri is a species of parasitic flowering plant in the genus Rafflesia. It was first described by Harry Wiriadinata and Rismita Sari in 2010. It is known from a single location, Sicikeh-Cikeh, a nature park in North Sumatra.

== Description ==
Rafflesia meijeri was first described by Harry Wiriadinata and Rismita Sari in 2010. They published their discovery in the journal Reinwardtia entitled "A new species of Rafflesia (Rafflesiaceae) from North Sumatra". Only male plants were obtained in the type locality at the time of its discovery.

The male flower has a width of 13–14 centimetres (5.1–5.5 in) and a height of 5–6 centimetres (2.0–2.4 in). The mature bud has a diameter between 9–10 centimetres (3.5–3.9 in). The petals, known as the perigone lobes, are coarse and brick colored. The lobes are 5–6 by 3.7–4.5 centimetres (2.0 in–2.4 in × 1.5 in–1.8 in) in size. The perigone tube, a fused section of the petals resembling a bowl, has a height of 4.5–5 centimetres (1.8–2.0 in) and a width of 9–10 centimetres (3.5–3.9 in). The ramenta, interior scales, are filiform, or hair-like, rather than the swollen ramenta of Rafflesia rochussenii.

This species is similar to the related Rafflesia rochussenii in its morphology. Both flowers lack the processes, tentacle-like stamens, on the disc that many other flowers in the same genus have. R. rochussenii is known from West Java, while R. meijeri is known from North Sumatra. The two species differ not only because of their geographic separation, but additionally the two species display some differing morphological characteristics. R. meijeri differs by its patterning of the warts on the perigone lobe, or the "petals" of the flower. The warts of R. meijeri are irregular in patterning rather than regular. It additionally differs the morphology of the ramenta, scales on the interior of the flower. The tip of the ramenta for R. rochussenii is swollen, compared to the filiform ramenta of R. meijeri. Further genetic research is needed to determine if R. meijeri is indeed a separate species, as members of the genus show plasticity in their morphologies.

== Distribution ==
Rafflesia meijeri is known from a single location, Sicikeh-Cikeh, a nature park near Laehole Village, North Sumatra. Another source lists it being found west of Lake Toba in Parbuluan.

=== Habitat ===
Rafflesia meijeri is found in hilly secondary forest with a terrain of moderately steep slopes. The plant is found at an elevation of 1,320 metres (4,330 ft). It was also found in disturbed primary forest alongside members of the plant families Fabaceae, Fagaceae, Lauraceae, Rubiaceae, Zingiberaceae, among others.

== Etymology ==
Rafflesia meijeri is named after Willem Meijer, a researcher who studied Rafflesia plants. Meijer died in 2003 and the name of R. meijeri honours his contributions to the plant's study and conservation.
