= Rafflesia bengkuluensis =

Scientific classification
- Kingdom: Plantae
- Clade: Tracheophytes
- Clade: Angiosperms
- Clade: Eudicots
- Clade: Rosids
- Order: Malpighiales
- Family: Rafflesiaceae
- Genus: Rafflesia
- Species: R. bengkuluensis

Binomial name
- Rafflesia bengkuluensis Susatya, Arianto & Mat-Salleh, 2006

Species of flowering plant

Rafflesia bengkuluensis is a relatively new parasitic plant species of the genus Rafflesia. It is native to the Indonesian island of Sumatra. It was discovered after extensive research of R. arnoldii by the Department of Forest University of Bengkulu when they noticed some organisms being significantly smaller and were eventually classified as a separate species.
