= Louis Auguste Deschamps =

French botanist

Louis-Auguste Deschamps (22 August 1765 in Saint-Omer – 25 February 1842 in Saint-Omer) was a French botanist and surgeon, who specialised in the flora of Java and Mexico. He is probably best known for his description of the World's largest flower- Rafflesia, when he was in Java between 1791 and 1794. However, the British took his papers that were kept in the ship La 'Recherche' he was on that was harboured in Surabaya because they were fighting the French there, and he returned home without those papers in 1798.
