= Rafflesia cantleyi =

Scientific classification
- Kingdom: Plantae
- Clade: Tracheophytes
- Clade: Angiosperms
- Clade: Eudicots
- Clade: Rosids
- Order: Malpighiales
- Family: Rafflesiaceae
- Genus: Rafflesia
- Species: R. cantleyi

Binomial name
- Rafflesia cantleyi Solms

Species of flowering plant

Rafflesia cantleyi is a parasitic plant species of the genus Rafflesia. It can be found in Peninsular Malaysia and Pulau Tioman, an island off the east coast of Peninsular Malaysia. This species is almost identical to R. hasseltii, except for the number of warts on the perigone lobes of the two species. Another distinctive feature of R. cantleyi is its ability to form flowers on the aerial portions of its host Tetrastigma.

R. cantleyi was named after Nathaniel Cantley, curator of the Singapore Botanic Gardens.
