= Pathless Forest =

2024 book by Chris Thorogood

Pathless Forest: The Quest to Save the World's Largest Flowers is a non-fiction book written by University of Oxford botanist Chris Thorogood. Published in 2024, the book explores the world of plant biodiversity and the intricacies of botanical ecosystems, with a particular focus on the author's quest to find Rafflesia, the world's largest flower. Thorogood combines scientific insights with vivid descriptions and illustrations to bring the reader closer to the often-overlooked world of plants.

== Author ==
Thorogood is a botanist at the University of Oxford Botanic Garden. He is known for his research in plant science and his ability to communicate complex botanical concepts to the general public. Thorogood has authored several books and numerous scientific papers and frequently contributes to botanical art and illustration.

== Overview ==
Pathless Forest delves into various themes related to plant life, including:

- Biodiversity: Thorogood emphasizes plant species' vast diversity and ecological roles.
- Botanical explorations: The book recounts historical and contemporary botanical explorations, highlighting significant discoveries and the adventurers behind them.
- Biological interaction: It examines the relationships between plants and their environments, including symbiotic associations, competition, and adaptation.
- Nature conservation: Thorogood addresses the urgent need for plant conservation in the face of habitat loss and climate change.
- Quest for Rafflesia: A significant portion of the book is dedicated to Thorogood's journey to find Rafflesia, a parasitic flowering plant known for producing the largest individual flower in the world.

== Rafflesia ==
Rafflesia is a genus of parasitic flowering plants found in Southeast Asia, notable for producing the largest flowers in the world. The flowers can grow up to 3 feet in diameter and weigh up to 15 pounds. Rafflesia is known for its strong odor of decaying flesh, which attracts pollinators such as flies. The plant has no stems, leaves, or roots and relies entirely on a host vine for water and nutrients. Because of its peculiar biology and rarity, Rafflesia is a subject of fascination and scientific study.

== Illustrations ==
One of the distinctive features of Pathless Forest is the use of illustrations. Thorogood, an accomplished botanical artist, has created detailed illustrations to complement the text. These illustrations not only enhance the visual appeal of the book but also serve as educational tools, helping readers better understand botanical structures and processes.

== Narrative ==
The jungle sets the stage for a growing tension between the author's need to find Rafflesia, and its obstinance to remain hidden: a fight symbolized by the plants themselves – strangler figs, vines, creepers and so on. Pathless Forest is told through three voices. One is that of the author, based on his field diary extracts. The second voice is that of the flower, which acts as a narrative device to place plants centre-stage. The third voice is that of a forester in Sumatra who sends cryptic text messages that create a narrative drive, pulling the author towards a purpose. These three voices become liminal towards the end of the book; like the plants, they intertwine: the forester becomes personified during a visit Sumatra, and the voice of the flower becomes subsumed by the author's subconscious; it becomes apparent at this point that they've drawn the author to Southeast Asia to show him that Rafflesia is in peril and needs saving.

== Reception ==
Critics and readers have praised Pathless Forest for its engaging writing style and the seamless integration of scientific information with storytelling. The book has been lauded for making botany accessible to a broader audience and inspiring a deeper appreciation for plant life.

== Publications ==
- Thorogood, Chris. Pathless Forest. Penguin Press, 2024. ISBN 9780241632628.

== See also ==
- List of Books by Chris Thorogood
- Botanical illustration
- Biodiversity
- Conservation Biology
- Rafflesia
