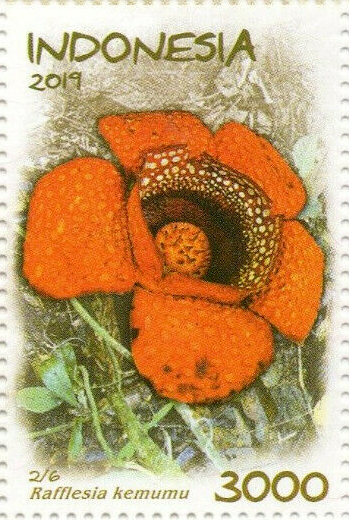

Scientific classification
- Kingdom: Plantae
- Clade: Tracheophytes
- Clade: Angiosperms
- Clade: Eudicots
- Clade: Rosids
- Order: Malpighiales
- Family: Rafflesiaceae
- Genus: Rafflesia
- Species: R. kemumu

Binomial name
- Rafflesia kemumu Susatya, Hidayati & Riki, 2017

= Rafflesia kemumu =

Species of parasitic plant

Rafflesia kemumu is a parasitic plant species of the genus Rafflesia. It is endemic to the Indonesian island of Sumatra.
