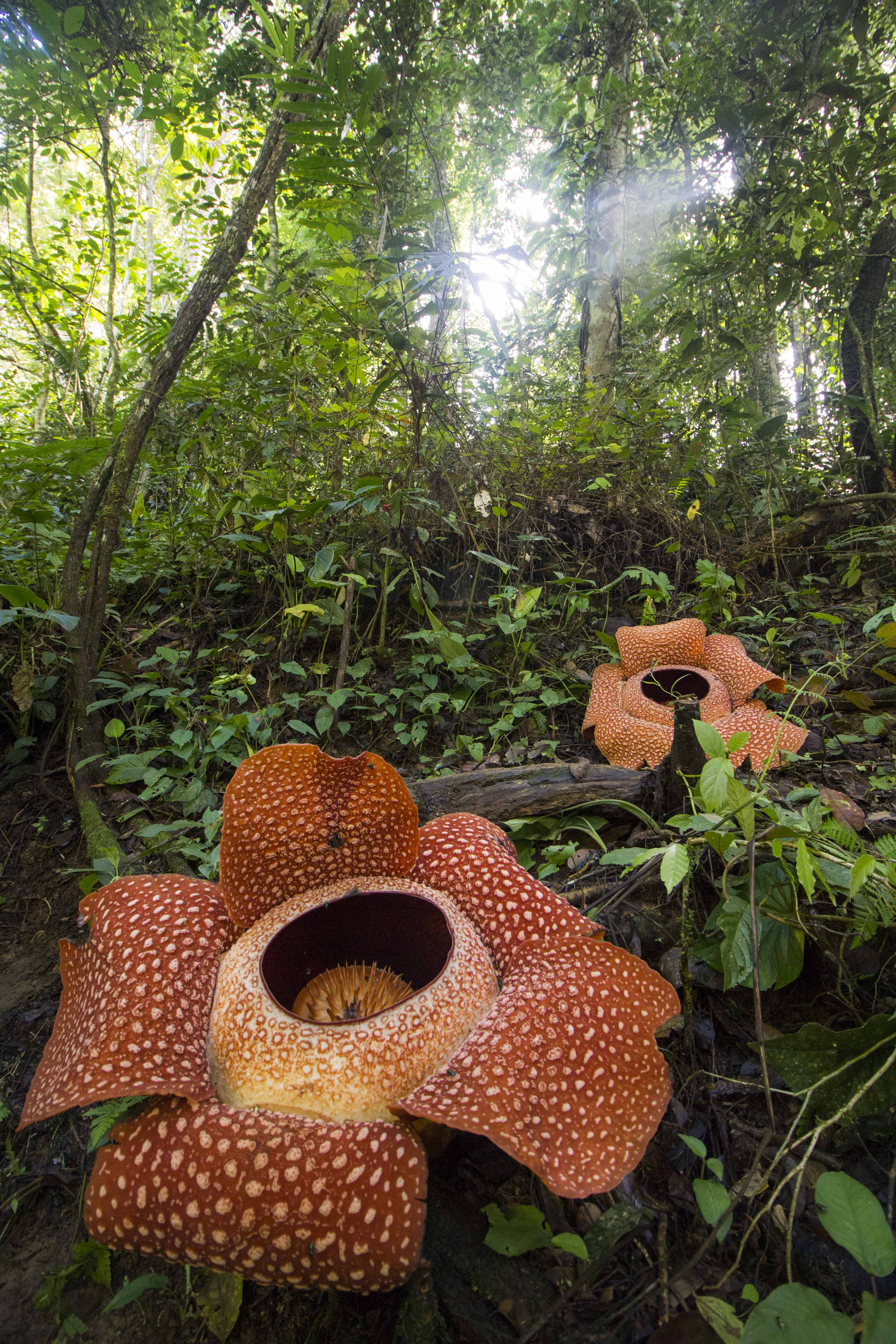
- Rafflesia arnoldii flowers in Bengkulu, Indonesia

Scientific classification
- Kingdom: Plantae
- Clade: Tracheophytes
- Clade: Angiosperms
- Clade: Eudicots
- Clade: Rosids
- Order: Malpighiales
- Family: Rafflesiaceae
- Genus: Rafflesia; R.Br. ex Thomson bis

Type species
- Rafflesia arnoldii R.Br.

Species
- See Classification section

= Rafflesia =

Genus of flowering plants

Rafflesia (/rəˈfliːz(i)ə, -ˈfliːʒ(i)ə, ræ-/), or stinking corpse lily, is a genus of parasitic flowering plants in the family Rafflesiaceae. The species have enormous flowers, the buds rising from the ground or directly from the lower stems of their host plants; one species has the largest flower in the world. Plants of the World Online lists up to 41 species from this genus; all of them are found in Southeast Asia.

Western Europeans first learned about plants of this genus from French surgeon and naturalist Louis Deschamps when he was in Java between 1791 and 1794; but his notes and illustrations were seized by the British in 1798 and were not available to Western scientists until 1861. The first British person to see one was Joseph Arnold in 1818, in the Indonesia rainforest in Bengkulu, Sumatra, after a Malay servant working for him discovered a flower and pointed it out to him. The flower, and the genus, was later named after Stamford Raffles, the leader of the expedition and the founder of the British colony of Singapore.

The following is from Arnold's account of discovering the flower:

Here I rejoice to tell you I happened to meet with what I consider as the greatest prodigy of the vegetable world. I had ventured some way from the party, when one of the Malay servants came running to me ... To tell you the truth, had I been alone, and had there been no witnesses, I should, I think, have been fearful of mentioning the dimensions of this flower, so much does it exceed every flower I have seen or heard of.

Vivid contemporary accounts documenting some of the most inaccessible species of Rafflesia are described in the popular science book, Pathless Forest: The Quest to Save the World's Largest Flowers, by botanist Chris Thorogood based at the University of Oxford Botanic Garden.

== Description ==
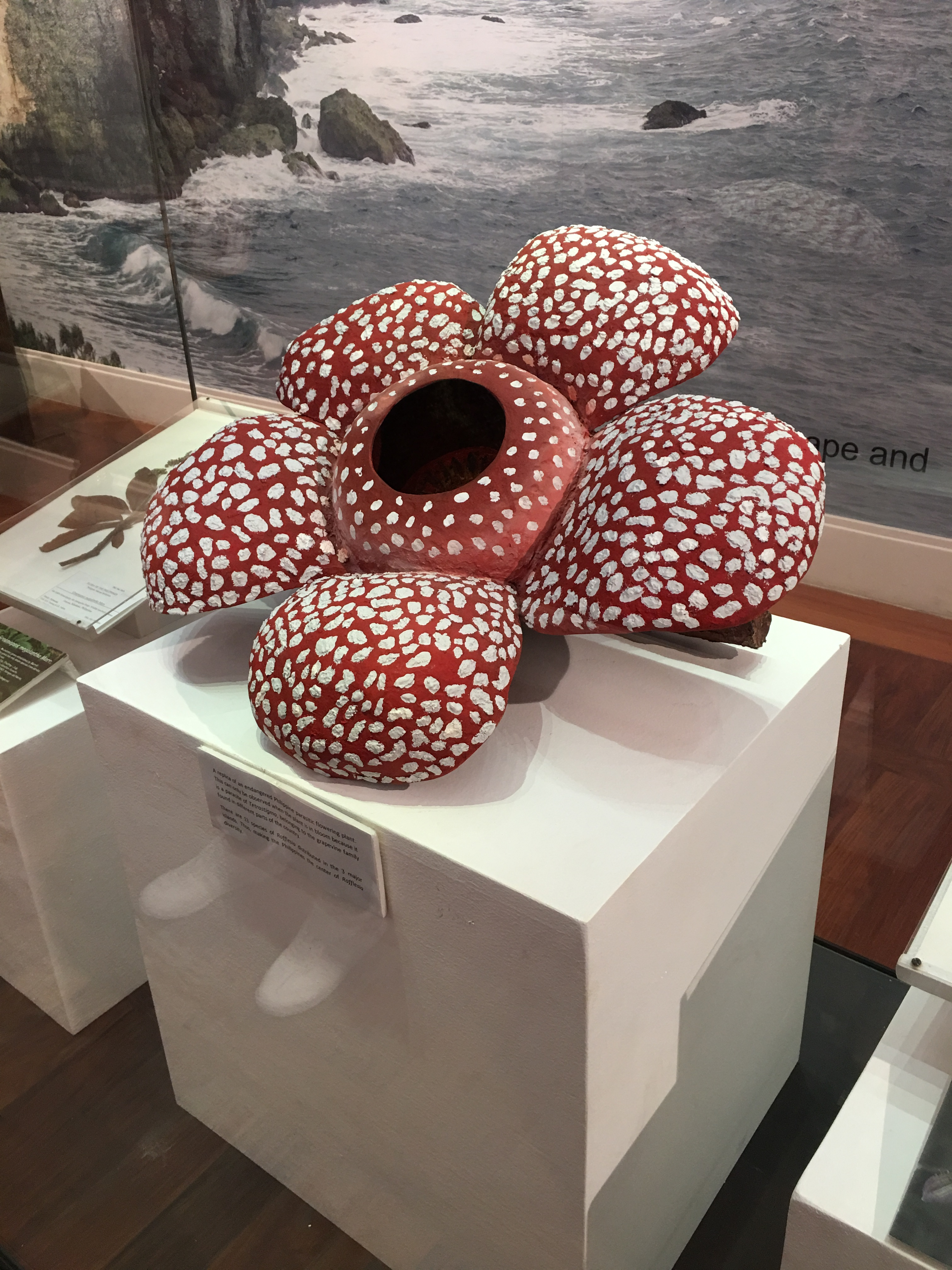
Replica of Rafflesia flower displayed in National Museum of Natural History in Manila.

The plant has no stems, leaves or roots. It is a holoparasite of vines in the genus Tetrastigma (a plant in the Vitaceae, the grape vine family), spreading its absorptive organ, the haustorium, inside the tissue of the vine. The only part of the plant that can be seen outside the host vine is the five-petalled flower. In some species, such as Rafflesia arnoldii, the flower may be over 100 centimetres (40 in) in diameter, and weigh up to 10 kilograms (22 lb). A Rafflesia that bloomed in West Sumatra in January 2020 was measured to be 111 centimetres (44 in) in diameter, the largest flower ever recorded—4 centimetres (1.6 in) wider than the flower reported as the largest in 2017. Even one of the smallest species, R. baletei, has 12 cm (5 in) diameter flowers. A team of morphologists and geneticists headed by Prof. Charles Davis of Harvard has discovered an important difference between Rafflesia spp. and the very similar Sapria spp. In both genera the petals are now described as sepals (or more correctly as "petaloid tepals") instead of vaguely defined "perigon lobes". In Sapria, the "diaphragm" is a true corona while in Rafflesia the diaphragm is made up of adnate petals to form a dome, the true corona being greatly reduced and fused with the adnate petals.

The flowers look and smell like rotting flesh. The foul odour attracts insects such as carrion flies, which transport pollen from male to female flowers. Most species are dioecious, having separate male and female flowers, but a few (R. baletei and R. verrucosa) have hermaphroditic flowers. Little is known about seed dispersal. Tree shrews and other forest mammals eat the fruits. The extremely tiny seeds have extremely tiny elaiosomes, and are thus most likely dispersed by ants. The seeds are packed into berries, each of which contains hundreds of thousands of seeds.

Because Amorphophallus has the world's largest unbranched inflorescence, it is sometimes mistakenly credited as having the world's largest flower. Both Rafflesia and Amorphophallus are flowering plants, but they are unrelated to each other. Rafflesia arnoldii has the largest single flower of any flowering plant, at least in terms of weight. Amorphophallus titanum has the largest unbranched inflorescence, while the talipot palm (Corypha umbraculifera) forms the largest branched inflorescence, containing thousands of flowers; the talipot is monocarpic, meaning the individual plants die after flowering.

Rafflesia are also remarkable for showing a large horizontal transfer of genes from their host plants. This is well known among bacteria, but not higher organisms. It occurs in the mitochondria (originally derived from bacteria) found within the cells of Rafflesia; these appear to have exchanged genes with the mitochondria of the host tissue.

== Names ==
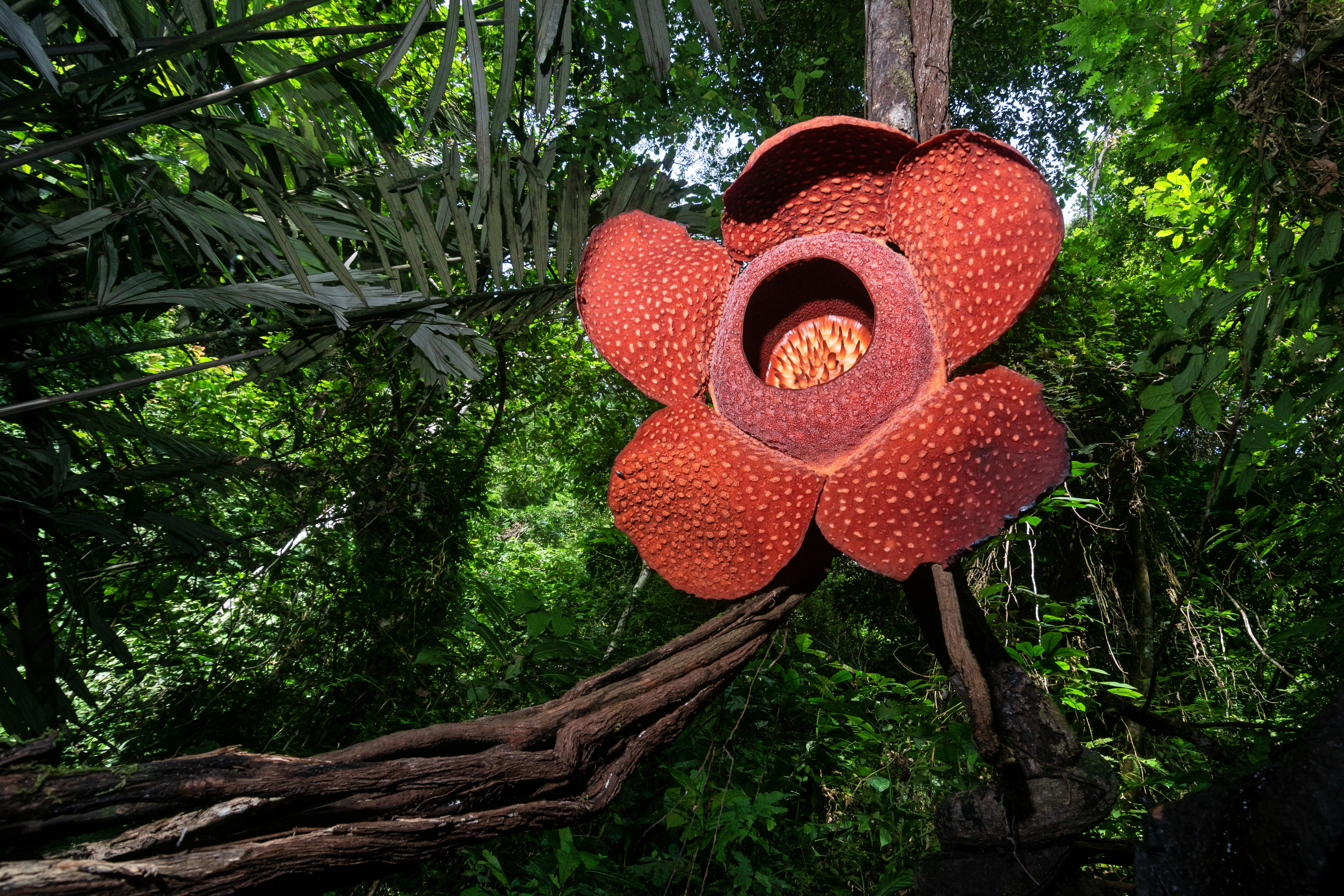
Rafflesia on hanging roots. West Sumatra, Indonesia.

In Indonesian and Malaysian, it is known as padma. The species R. arnoldii is known as padma raksasa ("giant padma"). In Javanese it is called patma. In Malay, the 'normal' R. hasseltii is vernacularly known as pakma, patma or ambai-ambai, whereas the goliath R. arnoldii from Sumatra is called krubut or kerubut, 'great flower'. The words padma, pakma or patma originate etymologically from the word पद्म (padma), Sanskrit for 'lotus'.

In English, Rafflesia is known as the stinking corpse lily. It is also known as "corpse flower", or bunga bangkai in Indonesian, a name that more commonly refers to the titan arum (Amorphophallus titanum) of the family Araceae. The type species Rafflesia arnoldii has been called the "monster flower".

== Taxonomy ==
Robert Brown introduced the genus Rafflesia to the wider scientific world in a presentation before the Linnean Society of London in June 1820, but his scientific paper on the subject was only published in late 1821.

In 1999, the British botanical historian David Mabberley pointed out that the genus Rafflesia was first validated by an anonymous report on the meeting published in the Annals of Philosophy in September 1820 (the name was technically an unpublished nomen nudum until this publication). Mabberley claimed the author was Samuel Frederick Gray. However, as that is nowhere stated in the Annals, per Article 46.8 of the code of ICBN, Mabberley was wrong to formally ascribe the validation to Gray. The validation of the name was thus attributed to one Thomas Thomson, the editor of the Annals in 1820, by the IPNI. Mabberley admitted his error in 2017. This Thomson was not the botanist Thomas Thomson, who was three years old in 1820, but his identically named father, a chemist.

== Evolution and phylogeny ==
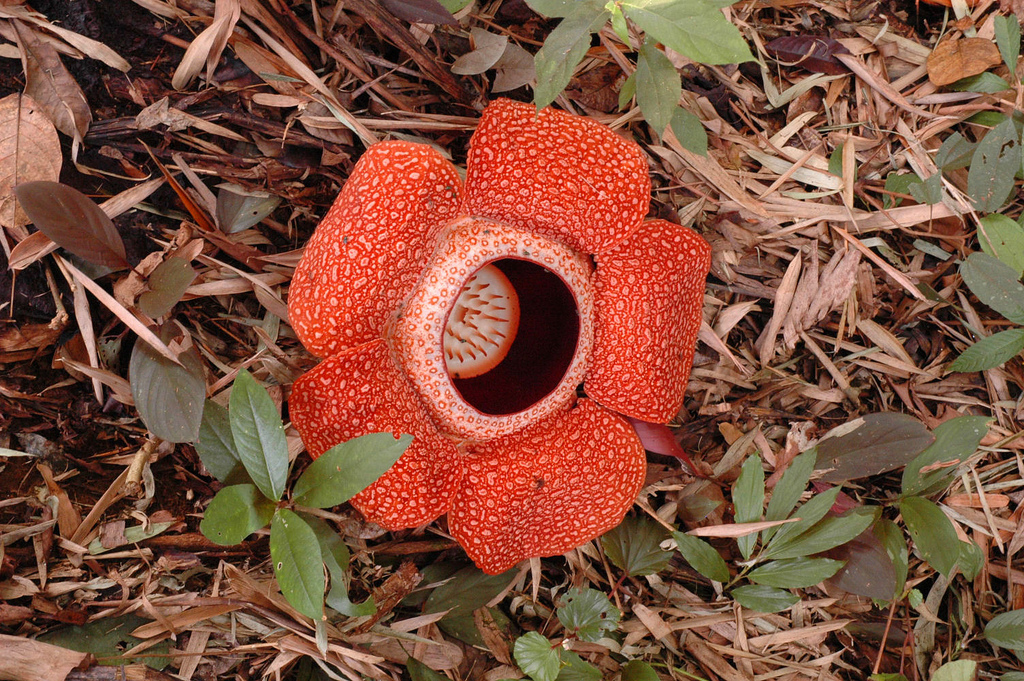
Rafflesia keithii bloom, approximately 80 cm in diameter near Taman Nasional Rafflesia Bengkulu, Indonesia

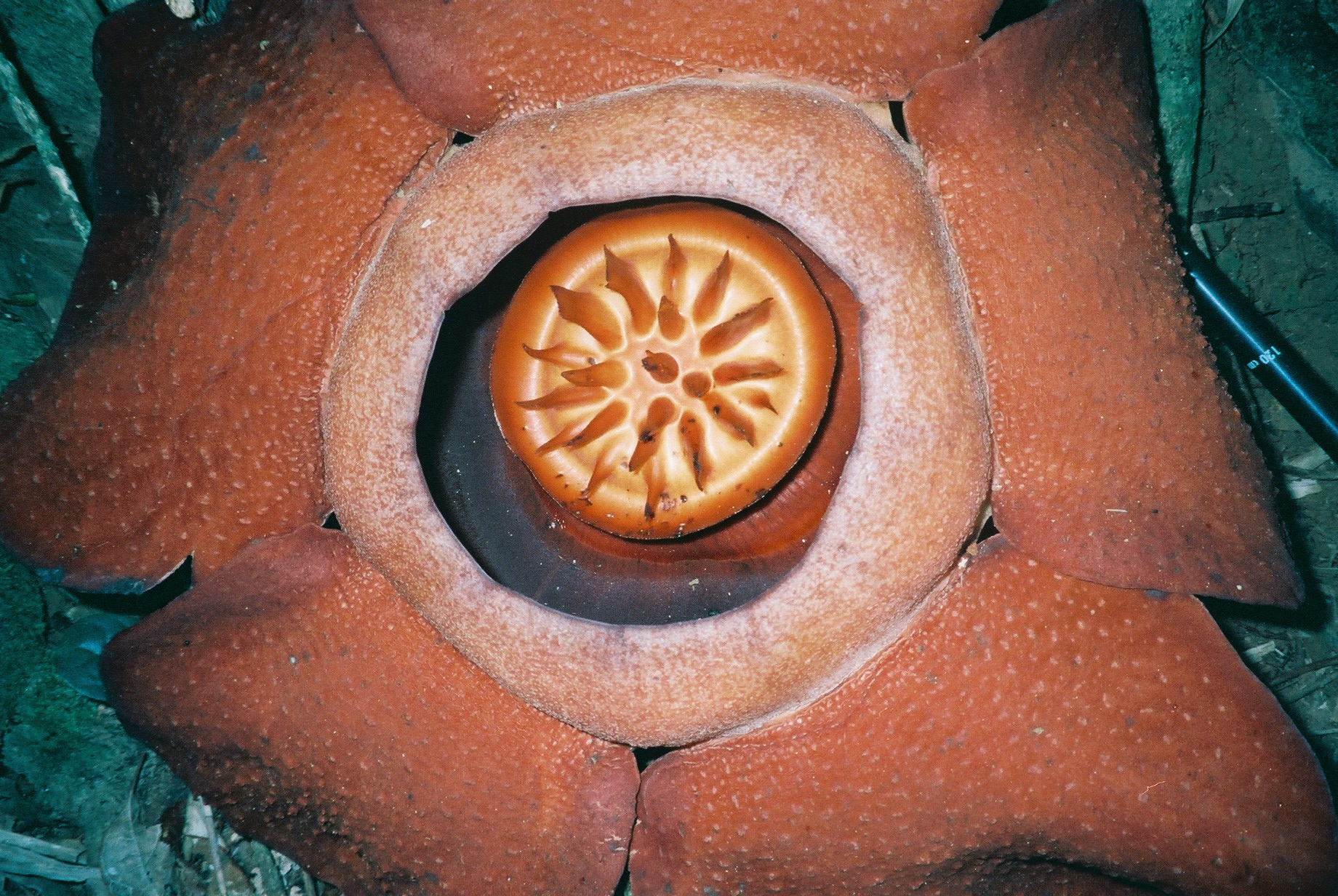
Rafflesia kerrii flower near Langkat, Indonesia

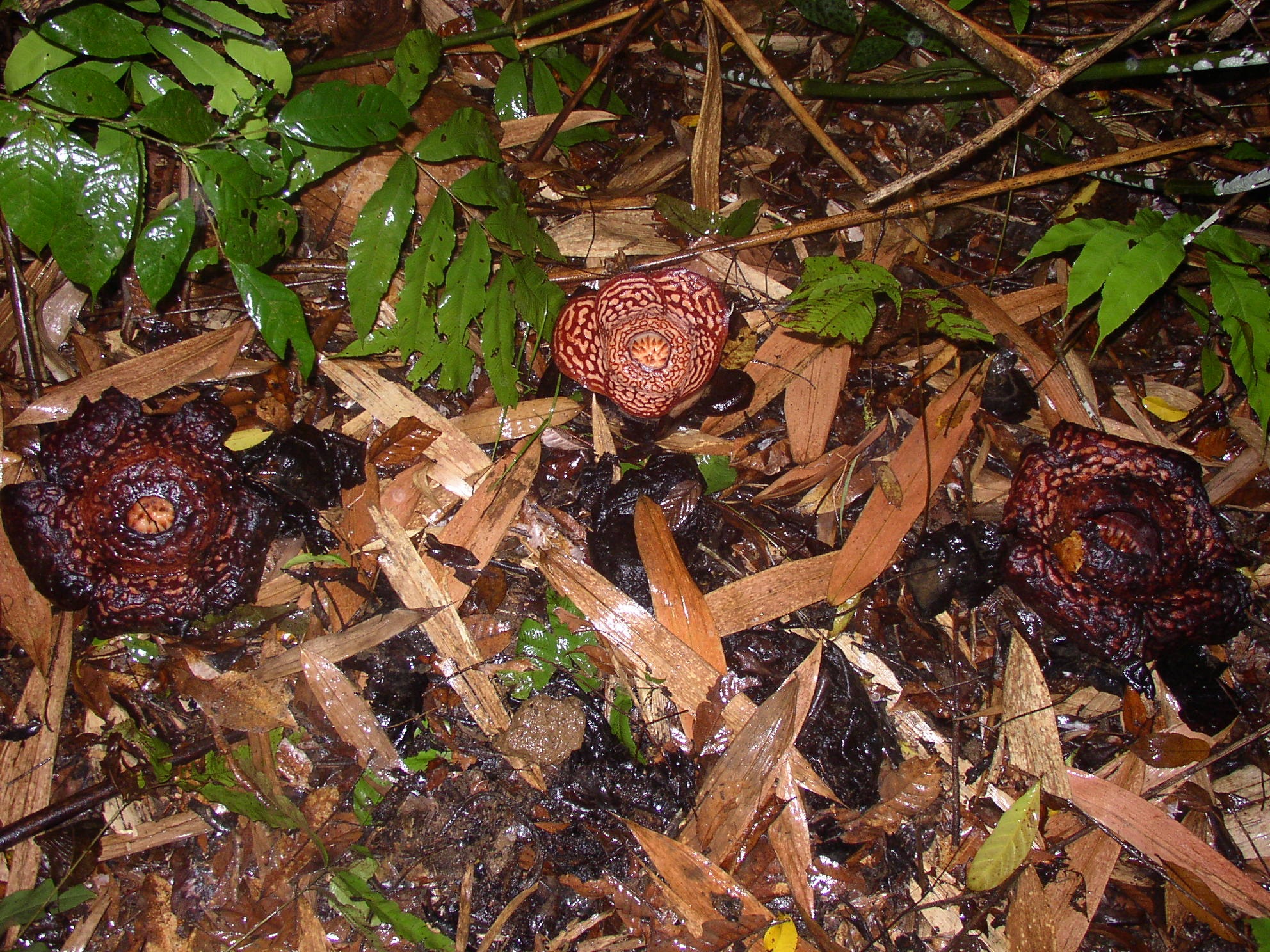
Three Rafflesia pricei growing in close proximity near Mount Kinabalu, Borneo

Rafflesia flower buds at Gunung Gading National Park, Sarawak, Malaysia

Comparison of mitochondrial DNA (mtDNA) sequences of Rafflesia with other angiosperm mtDNA indicated this parasite evolved from photosynthetic plants of the order Malpighiales. Another 2004 study confirmed this result using both mtDNA and nuclear DNA sequences, and showed the three other groups traditionally classified in Rafflesiaceae were unrelated. A 2007 study more specifically found Rafflesia and its relatives to be embedded within the family Euphorbiaceae as traditionally circumscribed, which was surprising, as members of that family typically have very small flowers. According to their analysis, the rate of flower size evolution was more or less constant throughout the family except at the origin of Rafflesiaceae, where the flowers rapidly evolved to become much larger before reverting to the slower rate of change.

To maintain monophyletic families, in 2016 the APG IV system separated the family Peraceae from the Euphorbiaceae. A summary cladogram is shown below, with family placements in the APG IV system.

- Euphorbiaceae sensu lato
  - Peraceae (3 genera in the study)
  - - Rafflesiaceae
      - Sapria
      - - Rhizanthes
        - Rafflesia
    - Euphorbiaceae sensu stricto (18 genera in the study)

A 2010 molecular phylogenetic study of 18 species of Rafflesia found that they fell into four clear-cut geographically defined groups:

- Rafflesia
  - Philippines group
    - Rafflesia speciosa
    - - Rafflesia manillana
      - - Rafflesia lobata
        - Rafflesia sp.
  - - Peninsular Malaysia group
      - Rafflesia kerrii
      - - Rafflesia cantleyi
        - Rafflesia azlanii
    - - Borneo group
        - Rafflesia tuan-mudae
        - - Rafflesia tengku-adlinii
          - - Rafflesia keithii
            - Rafflesia pricei
      - Sumatra + Java group
        - - Rafflesia patma
          - Rafflesia rochussenii
        - - Rafflesia zollingeriana
          - - Rafflesia gadutensis
            - - Rafflesia hasseltii
              - - Rafflesia micropylora
                - Rafflesia arnoldii

However, the clear monophyly of the four geographical clades does not correspond to any clear difference in appearance. There is no consistency within the clades in the size of flowers, or the presence or absence of white warts; species in different clades resemble one another more than they do some other species within the same clade. Homoplasy – repeatedly gaining or losing traits – seems to be the rule within Rafflesia.

=== Accepted species ===
As of August 2026, Plants of the World Online accepted 42 species:

- Rafflesia arnoldii – Sumatra, Borneo
- Rafflesia aurantia – Philippines (Luzon)
- Rafflesia azlanii – Peninsular Malaysia
- Rafflesia baletei – Philippines (Luzon)
- Rafflesia banaoana Malabrigo – Philippines (Luzon); treated as a synonym of R. leonardi by other sources
- Rafflesia bengkuluensis – Sumatra (Indonesia)
- Rafflesia borneensis Koord. – Indonesian Borneo (northeast Kalimantan)
- Rafflesia camarinensis F.B.Valenz., Jaucian-Adan, Agoo & Madulid – the Philippines
- Rafflesia cantleyi – Peninsular Malaysia
- Rafflesia ciliata Koord. – Indonesian Borneo (northeast Kalimantan)
- Rafflesia consueloae – Philippines (Luzon)
- Rafflesia gadutensis – Sumatra (Indonesia)
- Rafflesia hasseltii – Sumatra
- Rafflesia horsfieldii R.Br. – West Java (Indonesia)
- Rafflesia keithii – Borneo
- Rafflesia kemumu Susatya, Hidayati & Riki – Sumatra (Indonesia)
- Rafflesia kerrii – Thailand, Peninsular Malaysia
- Rafflesia lagascae – Philippines (Luzon) - synonym Rafflesia panchoana
- Rafflesia lawangensis – Sumatra
- Rafflesia leonardi – Philippines (Luzon)
- Rafflesia lobata – Philippines (Panay)
- Rafflesia manillana – Philippines (Samar)
- Rafflesia meijeri Wiriad. & Sari – North Sumatra, Indonesia
- Rafflesia micropylora – Sumatra
- Rafflesia mira – Philippines (Mindanao)
- Rafflesia mixta – Philippines (Mindanao)
- Rafflesia parvimaculata Sofiyanti, K.Mat-Salleh, Khairil, Zuhailah, Mohd.Ros. & Burs – Peninsular Malaysia
- Rafflesia philippensis – Philippines (Luzon)
- Rafflesia pricei – Borneo
- Rafflesia rochussenii – Java, Sumatra
- Rafflesia schadenbergiana – Philippines (Mindanao)
- Rafflesia sharifah-hapsahiae J.H.Adam, R.Mohamed, Aizat-Juhari & K.L.Wan – Peninsular Malaysia
- Rafflesia speciosa – Philippines (Panay)
- Rafflesia su-meiae M. Wong, Nais & F.Gan – Peninsular Malaysia
- Rafflesia tengku-adlinii – Borneo (Sabah)
- Rafflesia tiomanensis Siti-Munirah, Salamah & Razelan – Pulau Tioman, Peninsular Malaysia
- Rafflesia tuan-mudae – Borneo (Sarawak)
- Rafflesia tuanku-halimii J.H.Adam, Aizat-Juhari, Azilah & K.L.Wan – Peninsular Malaysia
- Rafflesia tunku-azizahiae J.H.Adam, Aizat-Juhari & K.L.Wan
- Rafflesia verrucosa – Philippines (Mindanao)
- Rafflesia witkampii Koord. – Indonesian Borneo (East Kalimantan)
- Rafflesia zollingeriana Koord. – East Java (Indonesia)

=== Other names ===
- Rafflesia harjatiae – Indonesian Borneo (East Kalimantan)
- Rafflesia patma – Java; considered a synonym of R. horsfieldii by Plants of the World Online, apparently based on the confused writings of a British historian of botany, although R. horsfieldii, for which no specimens were ever collected, only a drawing made which was lost centuries ago, is not considered a valid taxon by Rafflesia experts.
- Rafflesia titan – A synonym of R. arnoldii; it was in fact validly published earlier, being rushed to publication in Singapore in 1820 by a British botanist who feared that the French, who had actually discovered a species before the British, might deny the glory of the species description to servants of the British Empire. In order to retain the honour of naming the species to the famous British scientist Robert Brown, the historian of botany mentioned above chose to pretend a 1821 pre-print Brown sent to a colleague was a valid 'effective publication', which has been accepted by the relevant British institutions.

=== Loss of the chloroplast genome ===
Research published in 2014 revealed that one Philippine Rafflesia species from the island of Luzon, R. lagascae (a synonym of R. manillana), may have lost the genome of its chloroplast and it is speculated that the loss happened due to the parasitic lifestyle of the plant.

== Distribution ==
=== Malay Peninsula ===
Rafflesia can be found along the area of Peninsular Malaysia and Thailand in the Malay Peninsula.

==== Malaysia ====
In Peninsular Malaysia, the flower can be found in few states, such as Kelantan, Pahang, Perak and Terengganu. In Perak, three species of the flower can be found in Royal Belum state park and Gerik forest reserve of which are Rafflesia kerrii, Rafflesia cantleyi and Rafflesia azlanii. Rafflesia azlanii was named after the Sultan of Perak, Sultan Azlan Shah. Meanwhile, two species of the flower hosted by Tetrastigma Planch can be found in three location in Kelantan. The Rafflesia cantleyi species can be found in Ulut Sat and Chabang Tongkat while Rafflesia kerrii can be found in Lojing. Furthermore, two locations in Pahang where this flower can be found are Lembah Benum forest reserve and Lata Jarum. For Terengganu, the flower of Rafflesia cantleyi species can be found in Kuala Berang. A flower has been found in this area hanging on the root of its host three metres above the ground, unlike the common flowers found on the ground roots.

The locations of these flowers are turned into tourist attractions for biodiversity lovers and hikers and helps to generate income for the local people.

==== Thailand ====
In Thailand, Rafflesia can be observed in Khao Sok National Park where the flowers are numbered and monitored by the park rangers.

=== Greater Sunda Islands ===
==== Sumatra ====
Rafflesia species in Sumatra are mostly found in the Western part of Barisan Mountains, with the exception of R. hasseltii which can also be found in Bukit Tigapuluh National Park and other parts of Jambi. Rafflesia arnoldii has the widest geographical distribution, ranging from Mount Leuser National Park in Aceh to the sections of Bukit Barisan Selatan National Park in Lampung.

==== Java ====
R. zollingeriana is the endemic species of Java, with limited population in Meru Betiri National Park, East Java. In West Java, Gede Pangrango National Park and Mount Salak is a known habitat for R.rochussenii, while the species of R. patma can be found in Pangandaran and Nusakambangan Nature Reserve.

==== Borneo ====
Species native to Borneo include R. arnoldii, R. cantleyi, R. harjatiae, R. hasseltii, R. keithii, R. kerrii, R. pricei, R. tengku-adlinii and R. tuan-mudae. R. arnoldii boasts the world's largest single bloom.

R. keithii is an endemic species in Sabah and the largest among the three species of Rafflesia found in Sabah. The flower size is between 60 cm to 80 cm. Due to its size, the flower is generally found on the forest floor growing on the underground stem or root of Tetrastigma lanceolarium. R. keithii can be mostly found around the area of Poring, Sabah.

=== The Philippine Archipelago ===
==== Visayas ====
The species of Rafflesia can be found in Panay from within the Sibalom Natural Park and the surrounding mountainous regions of the Central Panay Mountain Range and sightings of this plant have been found and noted in the towns of San Remigio, Culasi, Valderrama, Barbaza and Sebaste and also in Iloilo most particularly in the towns of Miagao, Igbaras, Leon, Alimodian, San Joaquin and Calinog.

===== Mindanao species =====
The Mindanao species is known as Rafflesia schadenbergiana, after the naturalist Alexander Schadenberg, who first discovered the species at the foothills of Mount Apo in 1882. With a flower of nearly a meter, it is close to the size of a seated child. On Mindanao, the species has been seen in Davao del Sur, South Cotabato and Mount Kitanglad in Bukidnon. R. mira and R. magnifica are two names for a single species. Both were discovered at Mount Candalaga in Maragusan, Compostela Valley. The two forms differ in size measurements in which the scientific description of R. magnifica came from measurements of flowers in full bloom while that of R. mira was from photographs of nearly dead samples. The medium-sized R. mira flowers measure about half a meter in diameter and they have round or elliptic perigone wart. The third species on Mindanao is the R. mixta which has only been found so far in the town of Mainit, Surigao del Norte. It shows a combination of three features of Philippine Rafflesia, namely: the shape and size of the conical process in R. schadenbergiana, the floral size and sparsely distributed perigone warts of R. speciosa, and the overall resemblance, floral size, faint scent, diaphragm and ramenta morphology of R. mira. A fourth species is Rafflesia verrucosa which is found only in Mount Kampalili in Davao Oriental Province.

== Ecology ==
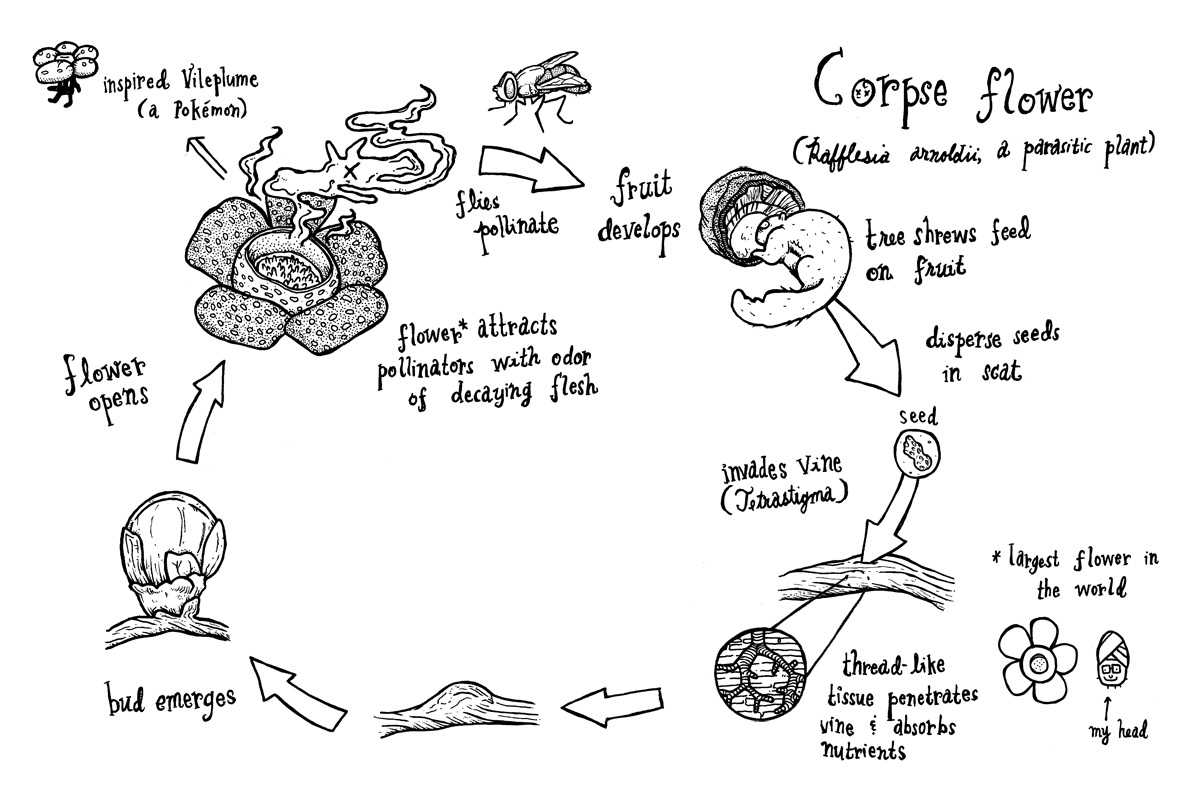
Rafflesia arnoldii life cycle.

Species of Rafflesia are all thought to be holoparasites of lianas of the genus Tetrastigma, vines which belong to the Vitaceae, the family of the grape vines. They are thus, in a way, hyperparasites, because Tetrastigma are themselves, in a way, structural parasites of the trees they use to climb up to the light. Rafflesia appear to be species-specific, with each Rafflesia species naturally only growing on one to three species of Tetrastigma. Of the 57 known species of Tetrastigma, only ten are known to be host plants. Of the 30 odd species of Rafflesia, the host plants are only known from about half of the species. A certain species of Tetrastigma is very popular among Rafflesia: T. tuberculatum is a host plant for at least 15 species, and only two Philippine species are not known to infect it. T. papillosum and T. diepenhorstii both host at least two species. The flowers may bud from different locations; R. cantleyi flowers from the vine some two meters from the ground, whereas R. zollingeriana always buds out of the roots and appears out of the ground.

The gender ratio may be skewed. In R. lobata there are approximately nine male flowers for every female flower. Rarely are there flowers of both sexes at one location to ensure pollination and thus sexual reproduction. This may not matter: female flowers usually form fruit anyway and may thus be agamospermous. Flowering is relatively constant, and sites may continue to flower for decades.

In Rafflesia arnoldii, the flowers are visited by the flies Drosophila colorata, Chrysomya megacephala and Sarcophaga haemorrhoidalis. Black ants of the genus Euprenolepis may feed on the developing flower buds, perhaps killing them. Mammals which are known to eat the flowers are the Javan treeshrew Tupaia javanica and the porcupine Hystrix javanica. Mammals which have been recorded destroying the buds or flowers, often simply by stepping on and crushing them, are: pigs (Sus scrofa), wild cats (Prionailurus bengalensis), rusa (Cervus timorensis), muntjak (Muntiacus muntjak) and banteng (Bos javanicus).

== Uses ==
In Thailand, the buds and flowers of R. kerrii are considered a delicacy. They are also harvested for herbalism, a concoction is believed to act as a sexual stimulant and to help for fever or backache. In the Philippines, the plants are also used in folk herbalism, but the flowers are also fed to swine as fodder. On Java, the buds of R. zollingeriana are harvested and dried for use in jamu, the ancient traditional herbalism of the island. It is unknown for what the buds are supposed to be good for; jamu concoctions are often complex mixtures and often are supposed to help with sexual prowess.

These plants also have some economic use in attracting ecotourists.

Research in Malaysia and Indonesia has made it possible to propagate the species for use in horticulture, with the famous Bogor Botanical Garden growing the first plants in the 1850s using grafts of infected vines. The Malaysian biologist Jamili Nais was the first to propagate the plants using the seeds around the year 2000.

== See also ==
- Amorphophallus titanum, a similar smelling plant, sometimes known as the "corpse flower"
- Parasitic plant
- Carrion flower
