= Rafflesia witkampii =

Scientific classification
- Kingdom: Plantae
- Clade: Tracheophytes
- Clade: Angiosperms
- Clade: Eudicots
- Clade: Rosids
- Order: Malpighiales
- Family: Rafflesiaceae
- Genus: Rafflesia
- Species: R. witkampii

Binomial name
- Rafflesia witkampii Koord.

Species of flowering plant

Rafflesia witkampii is a species of flowering plant in the family Rafflesiaceae. It is a parasitic flowering plant. Meijer (1997) provided a comprehensive treatment of Rafflesia in Flora Malesiana, where he reported five "incompletely known species": R. borneensis Koord., R. ciliate Koord, R. titan Jack, R. tuan-mudae Becc., and R. witkampii Koord. These five species were considered to be incomplete due to the lack of well-preserved specimens or a convincing type specimen, to a poor description, or to a description based on an immature bud. Nais (2001) re-instated R. tuan-mundae, R. witkampii, and R. zollingeriana in his account on Rafflesia.
