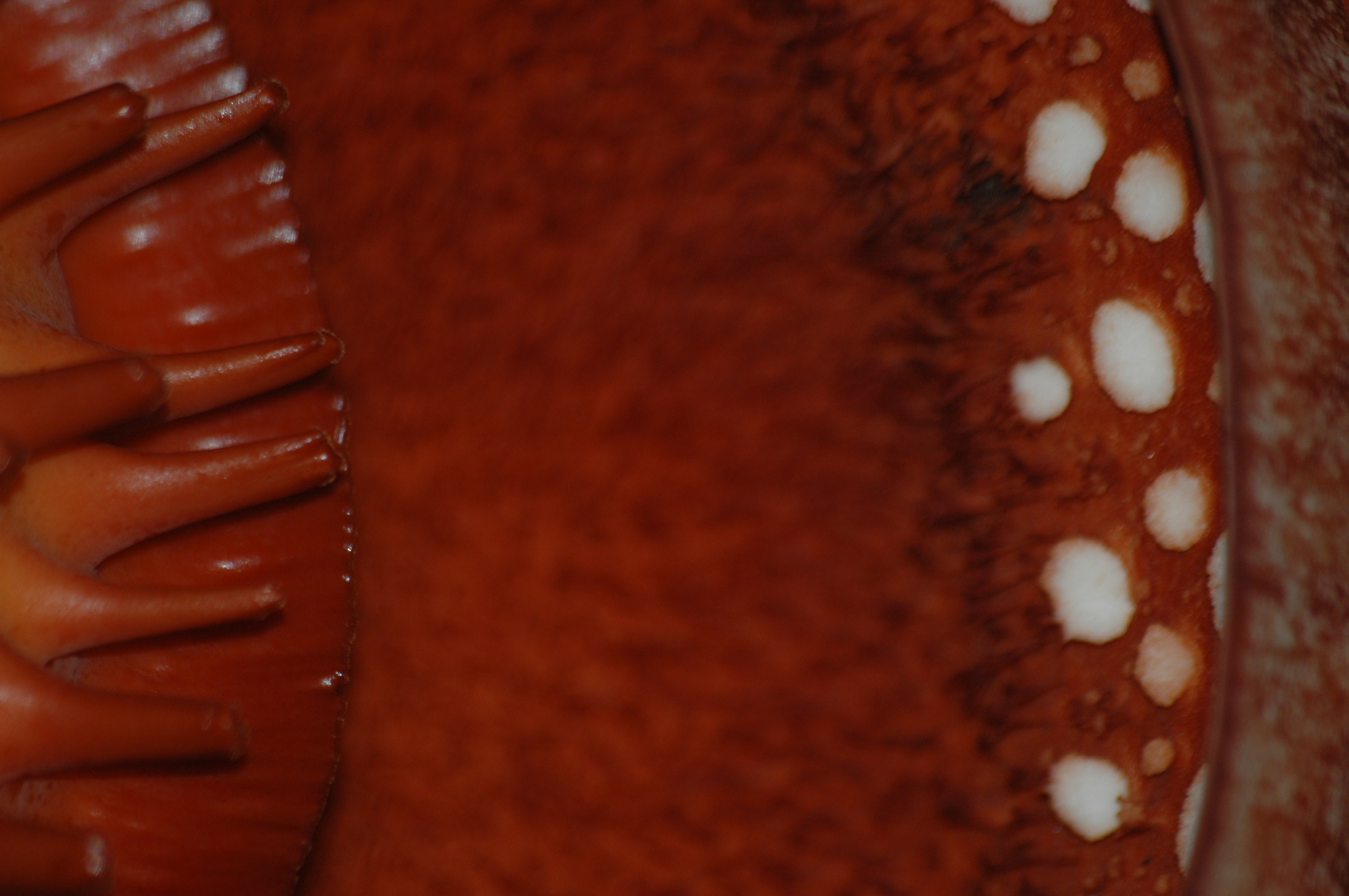
- Closeup of a flower measuring around 65 cm in diameter

Scientific classification
- Kingdom: Plantae
- Clade: Embryophytes
- Clade: Tracheophytes
- Clade: Spermatophytes
- Clade: Angiosperms
- Clade: Eudicots
- Clade: Rosids
- Order: Malpighiales
- Family: Rafflesiaceae
- Genus: Rafflesia
- Species: R. tuan-mudae

Binomial name
- Rafflesia tuan-mudae Becc.

= Rafflesia tuan-mudae =

Species of flowering plant

Rafflesia tuan-mudae is a member of the Rafflesiaceae family. It lives as a parasite within the Tetrastigma vines. The enormous flowers may reach over 1 m in diameter. The buds normally emerge where the vine is growing along the ground, unlike some of the other Rafflesia species whose buds can emerge from vines hanging in the air.

== Etymology ==
In the Malay language, tuan-mudae translates as young lord or prince and often refers to sons in prominent, wealthy, or noble families. The species epithet honors Charles Brooke, the second White Rajah of Sarawak, who at the time of the plant’s discovery held the Malay court title Tuan Muda Sarawak ("Young Rajah of Sarawak"). Odoardo Beccari, an eminent Italian botanist, named the species in recognition of Charles Brooke’s support of scientific exploration in Sarawak. Locally the flower is referred to as bunga pakma – bunga means flower in the Malay Language. The word pakma is a local vernacular name used in Sarawak Malay (and related Dayak usage) to refer to Rafflesia flowers.

== Description ==
Typically the flowers are around 60 cm in diameter opening from a 20 cm bud. Occasionally these buds reach 30 cm in diameter in which case a flower nearly 1 m across may form. In 2020, a specimen of Rafflesia tuan-mudae discovered in the Maninjau Forest Reserve in West Sumatra was measured at a diameter of 111 cm (3 ft 8 in). It is considered to be the world's largest recorded flower; the previous largest was found at the same site, so may be from the same plant.

At an easily accessible locality observed often for a few years in the Gunung Raja (mountains) straddling the border between Malaysia and Indonesia in western Borneo, southwest of Kuching, in the early 1930s, it was found that the plants bloomed continuously throughout the year – at least in 1933, which was apparently a good year for rafflesias throughout Indonesia.

== Ecology ==
The flowers can be found emerging from liana-like vines, specifically Tetrastigma rafflesiae and Tetrastigma diepenhorstii. The seeds reach the host plant by an unknown animal vector, penetrate the tissue of the root and grow inside the host tissue for an indefinite period of time before buds develop. The bud develops for nine months, before it becomes a gigantic orange to red flower. It stays in full bloom for just seven days. The main pollinator for this flower are flies. All Rafflesia flowers emit a rotting meat stench attracting pollinators, although the smell of R. tuan-mudae is comparatively mild. However, they are no less effective at attracting these flies, upon whose back pollen is deposited.

Male and female flowers can only be identified by fingering under the central disk for the anthers. However, visitors are encouraged not to touch or handle the buds in particular, as they are fragile and may die.

== Distribution ==
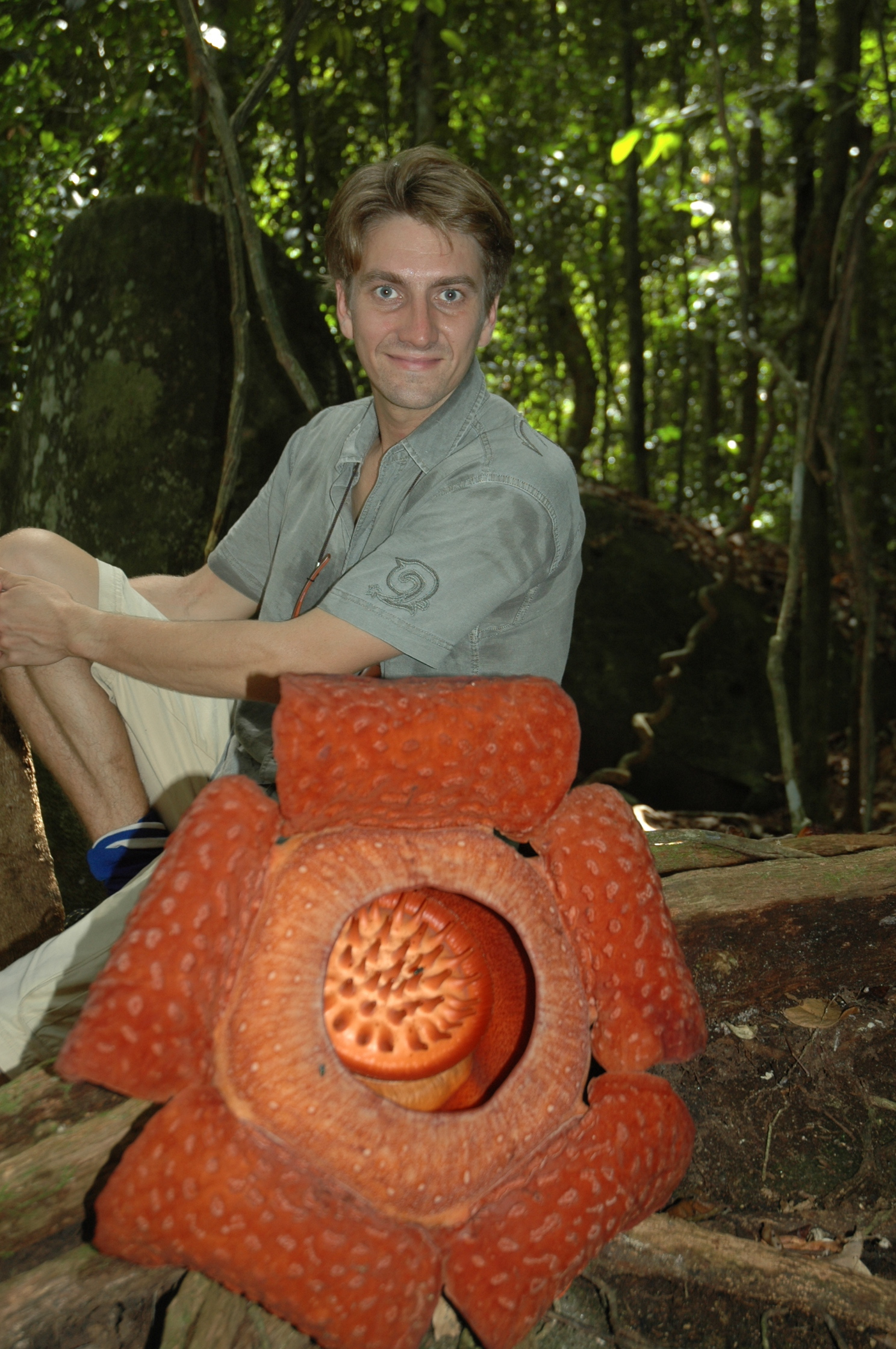
R. tuan-mudae in Gunung Gading National Park

In the 1910s, only a limited number of localities where the species had been found were known, but a number of new finds between then and 1935, especially in West Kalimantan, had expanded the distribution and the number of places that could be visited, albeit that some were/are quite remote.

In Sarawak, one of the easiest locations to see R. tuan-mudae is at Gunung Gading National Park. It can also be seen at Lanjak-Entimau Wildlife Sanctuary.
