= Rafflesia mira =

Conservation status
- Critically Endangered (IUCN 3.1)

Scientific classification
- Kingdom: Plantae
- Clade: Tracheophytes
- Clade: Angiosperms
- Clade: Eudicots
- Clade: Rosids
- Order: Malpighiales
- Family: Rafflesiaceae
- Genus: Rafflesia
- Species: R. mira

Binomial name
- Rafflesia mira Fernando & Ong

Synonyms
- Rafflesia magnifica Madulid, Tandang & Agoo

Species of flowering plant

Rafflesia mira is a member of the genus Rafflesia. It is endemic to the rainforest of Mindanao, Philippines and can only be found in the vicinity of Mount Candalaga, Davao de Oro province. The species was described later in 2005 by Madulid et al., as R. magnifica, but this name is a later synonym. According to the IUCN the species is found in only one unprotected locality: Mt.Candalaga Range in Maragusan, Davao de Oro, where the individuals are distributed in small groups. A road infrastructure project is planned on part of the mountain. Moreover, the lower mountain slopes are being converted into banana plantations. Currently there are not any protective measures in place.
