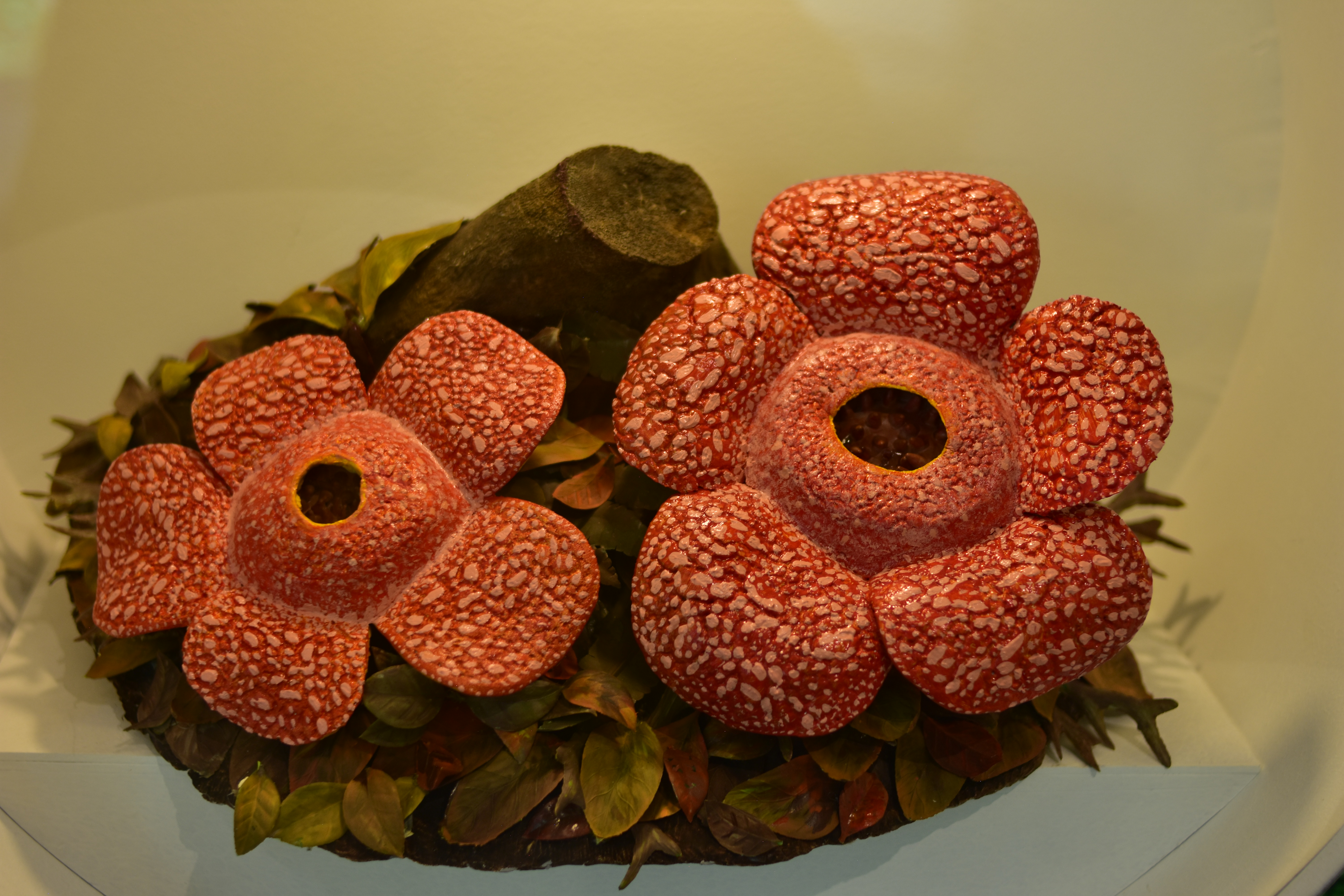
- Model of flowers

Scientific classification
- Kingdom: Plantae
- Clade: Embryophytes
- Clade: Tracheophytes
- Clade: Spermatophytes
- Clade: Angiosperms
- Clade: Eudicots
- Clade: Rosids
- Order: Malpighiales
- Family: Rafflesiaceae
- Genus: Rafflesia
- Species: R. baletei

Binomial name
- Rafflesia baletei Barcelona & Cajano

Synonyms
- Rafflesia irigaense nom. nud. Rafflesia irigaenses nom. nud.

= Rafflesia baletei =

Species of flowering plant

Rafflesia baletei is a parasitic plant species of the genus Rafflesia. It is endemic to the Philippines.

The species was first collected in 1991 by Bicolano mammalogist Danilo S. Balete on Mount Isarog and was initially thought to be Rafflesia manillana. It was only in 2006 that Filipino scientists confirmed the identity of this new species, naming it in Balete's honour. After the establishment of the identity of this species, a new population was rediscovered on Mount Isarog and Mount Iriga. See this citation for a review of Philippine Rafflesia.
