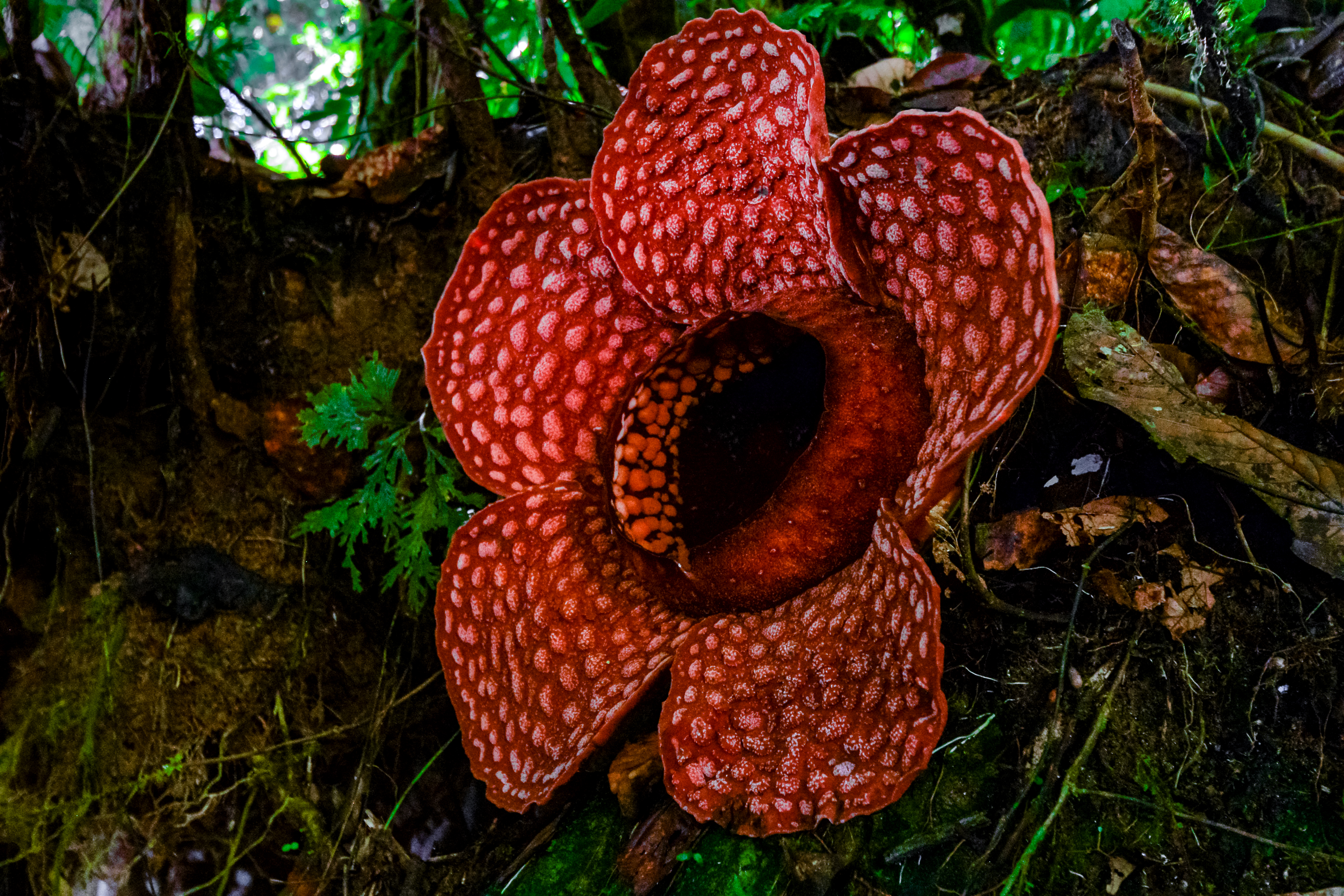

Scientific classification
- Kingdom: Plantae
- Clade: Tracheophytes
- Clade: Angiosperms
- Clade: Eudicots
- Clade: Rosids
- Order: Malpighiales
- Family: Rafflesiaceae
- Genus: Rafflesia
- Species: R. gadutensis

Binomial name
- Rafflesia gadutensis Meijer

= Rafflesia gadutensis =

Species of flowering plant

Rafflesia gadutensis is a parasitic plant species of the genus Rafflesia. It is native to the Indonesian island of Sumatra. R. gadutensis was named after the place where it was first collected, Ulu Gadut, in West Sumatra.
