= Gunung Gading National Park =

National park in Sarawak, Malaysia

- IUCN category II (national park)
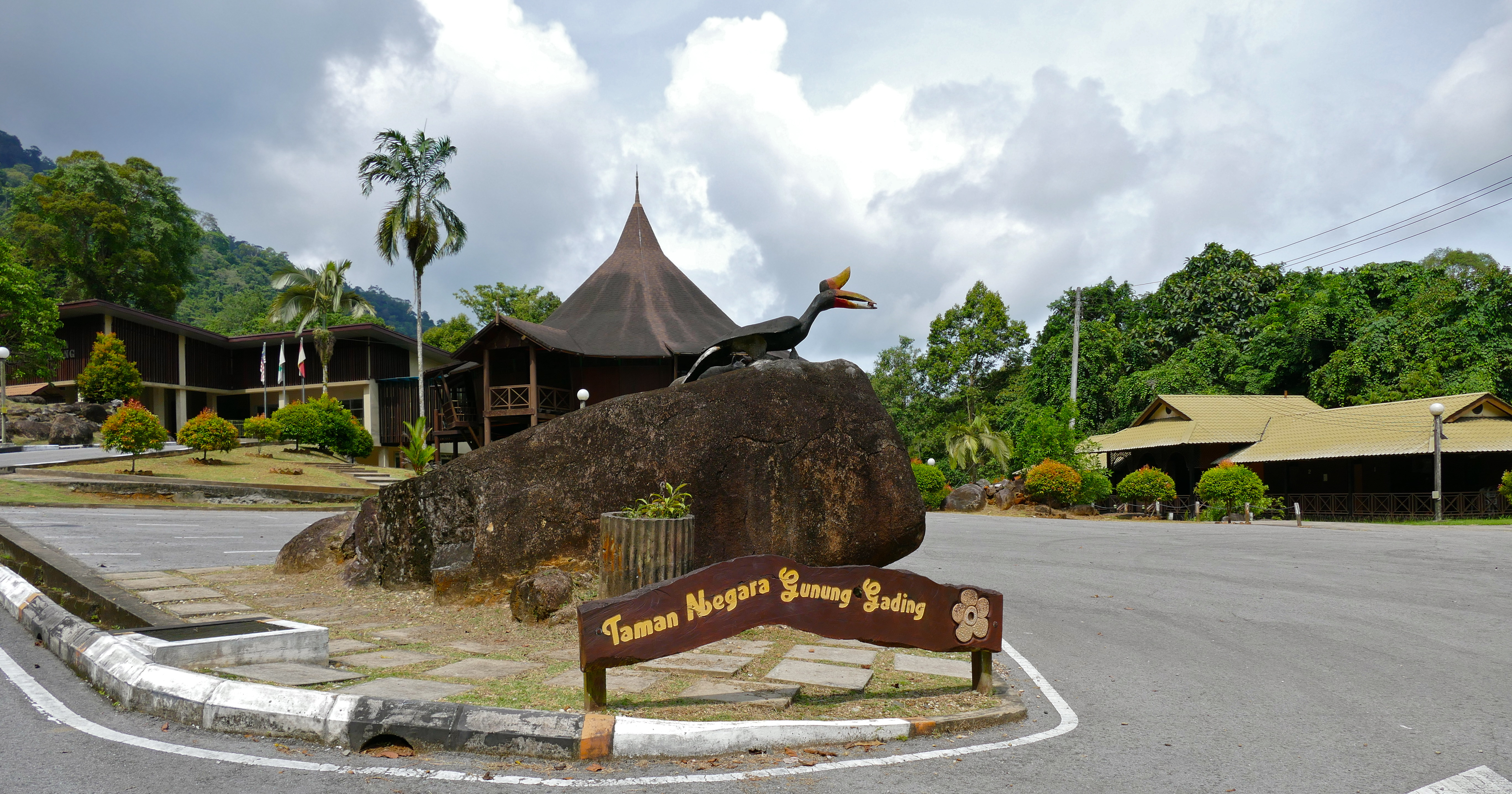
- The park's main entrance

- Location within Borneo
- Location: Sarawak, Malaysia
- Nearest city: Kuching
- Coordinates: 1°41′26″N 109°50′45″E
- Area: 43.6 km^{2} (16.8 sq mi)
- Established: 1983
- Governing body: Sarawak Forestry Corporation

Gunung Gading National Park (Malay: Taman Negara Gunung Gading) is located near the town of Lundu in southwest Sarawak, is known for its population of Rafflesia, the world's largest flowering plant. The park encompasses sections of lowland and hill rainforest and includes a network of trails leading to waterfalls and forested slopes. Though relatively small in size, the park contains a variety of natural features characteristic of Sarawak's tropical forest environments.

== Geography ==
Gunung Gading National Park lies near the westernmost point of Borneo, approximately 75 kilometres (47 mi) southwest of Kuching, close to the Indonesian border. Covering 41 square kilometres (16 sq mi), the park centers on a hill tropical rainforest ecosystem, with terrain characterised by granite slopes and mixed dipterocarp forest. This forest ecosystem once covered all of northwest Borneo but now survives in isolated fragments, and Gunung Gading is one of the more extensive of these surviving vestiges.

The park's topography consists of two main hills, one of which is Gunung Gading itself, with the amenity of a signed trail that is six hours for the return journey to the summit. There is a network of other trails that run through forested slopes and along streams, ultimately concluding in a series of waterfalls, the Waterfall Trail concluding at the seventh and final cascade. Combination of elevation, subsiding geology, and varied relief allows for distinctive forest communities within a relatively small area. Located above Lundu town, the park is near coastal beaches and easily reached by a scenic road through agricultural land and river crossing from Kuching, making it suitable for a wide range of outdoor activities.

== History ==
Gunung Gading National Park was established in 1983 with the primary goal of protecting Rafflesia tuan-mudae, one of the world's largest and most endangered flowering plants. The reason for its establishment was to rescue this species as well as its habitat. The park received minimal visitation from foreign tourists and was largely a domestic destination initially. The peak of the number of visitors was in 1995, following the development of park facilities, which spurred a wave of interest among Malaysian tourists. Although tourism decreased in subsequent years, it gradually increased again with more international tourists coming in. A visitor centre, modelled after a traditional Bidayuh head-house, was erected to support conservation education and houses exhibits pertaining to Rafflesia.

== Flora and fauna ==
Although blossoming is erratic and brief, Gunung Gading is one of the few places in Borneo where the uncommon Rafflesia tuan-mudae can be seen in bloom. Amorphophallus, a huge lily that blooms even less frequently, is another rare plant in the area. Park rangers notify travel agencies and tourist offices when these plants are anticipated to bloom in order to notify prospective tourists. The park contains natural elements such woodland pathways, bathing streams, and freshwater ponds in addition to these noteworthy plant species and general rainforest variety.

== Gallery ==
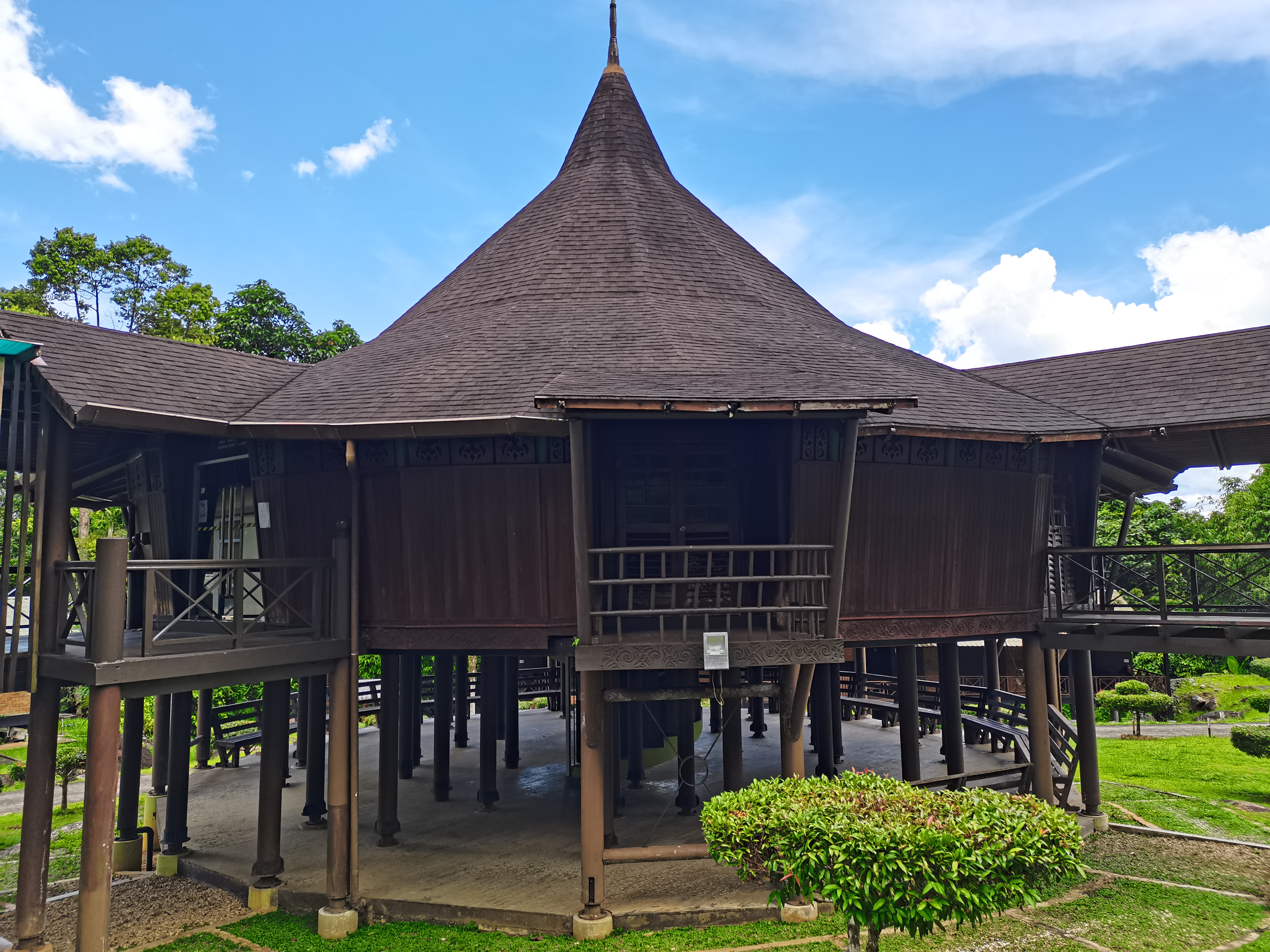
Baruk house

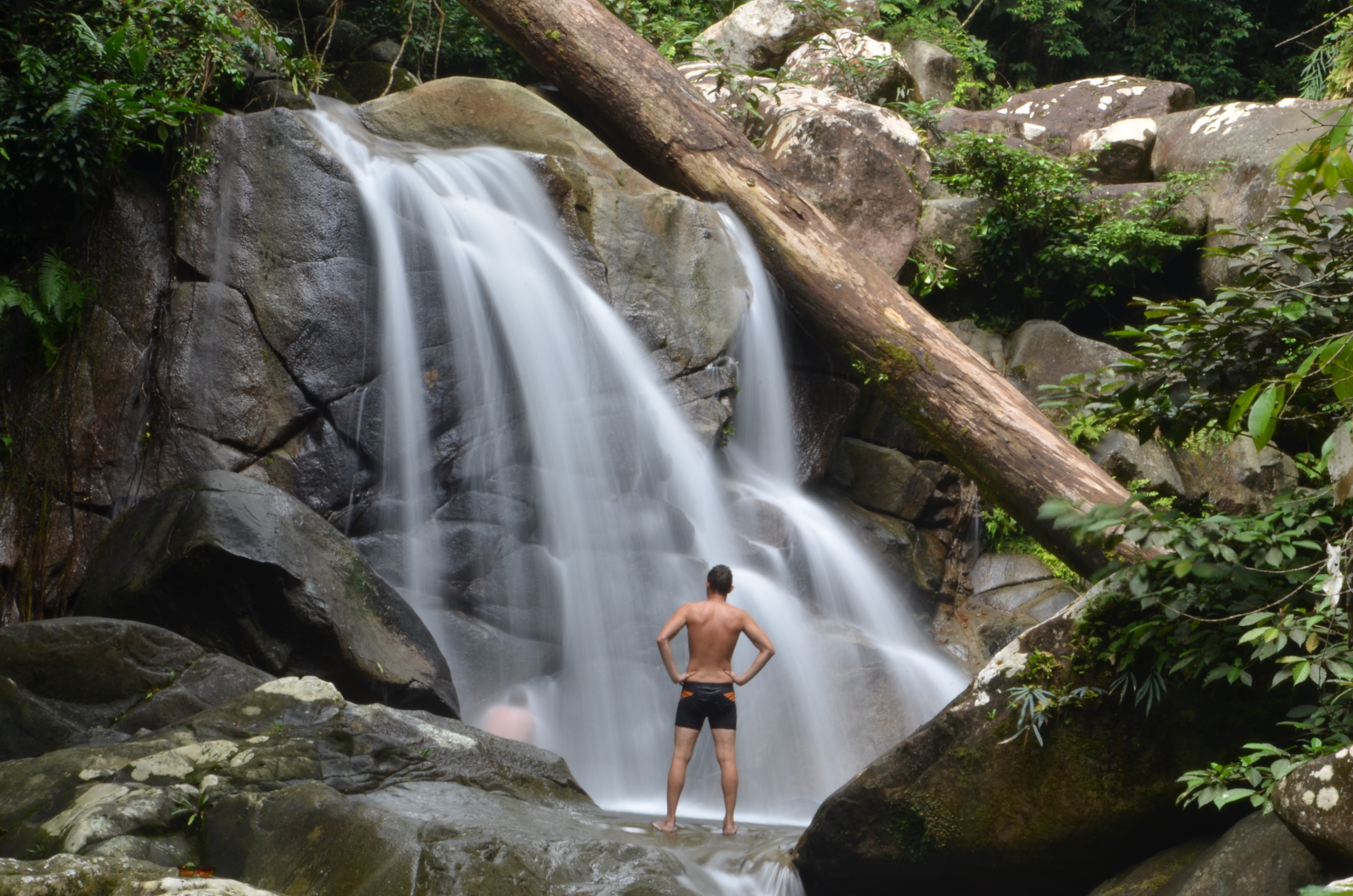
Gunung Gading waterfall

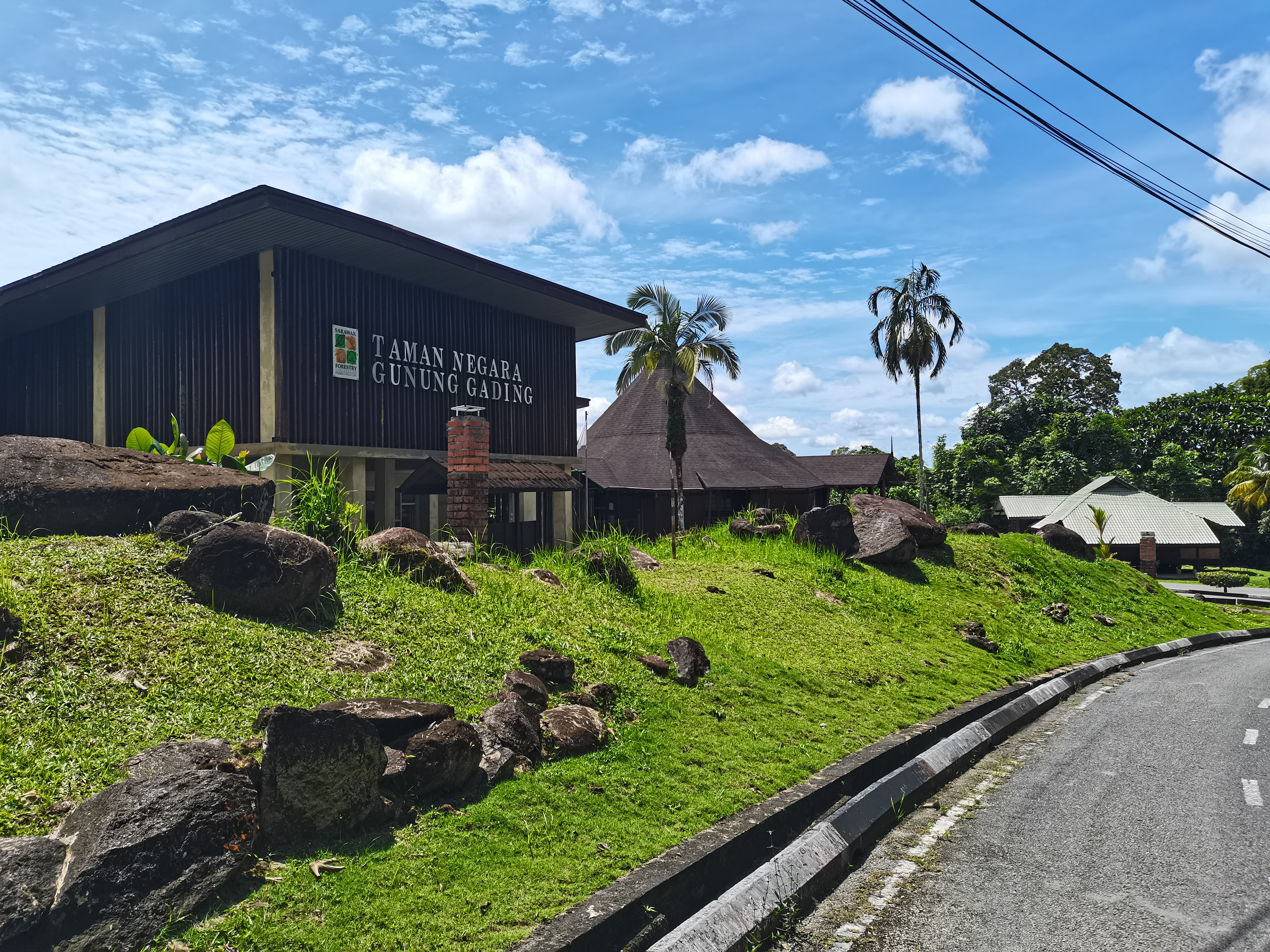
The park's headquarters

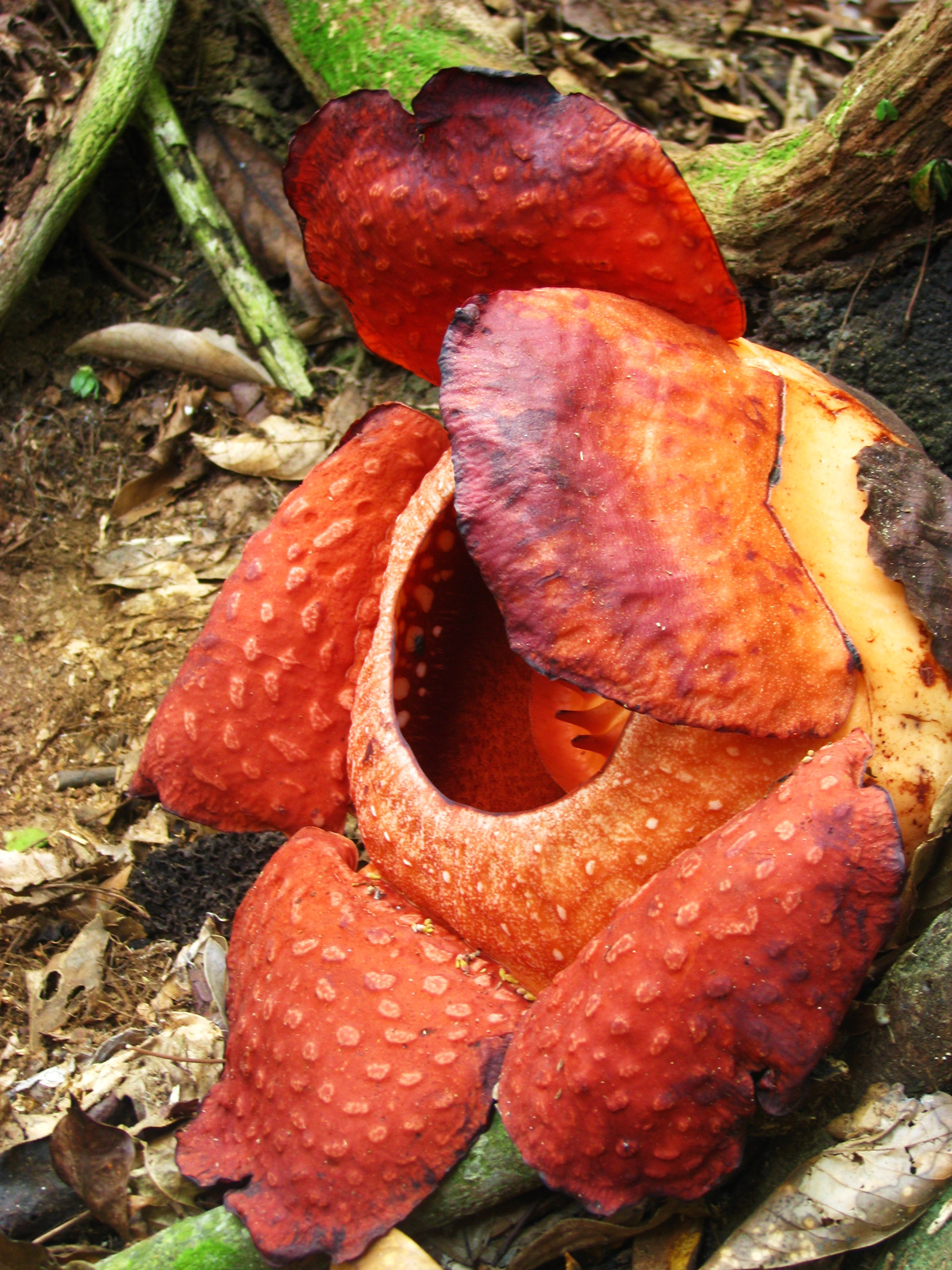
Rafflesia tuan-mudae

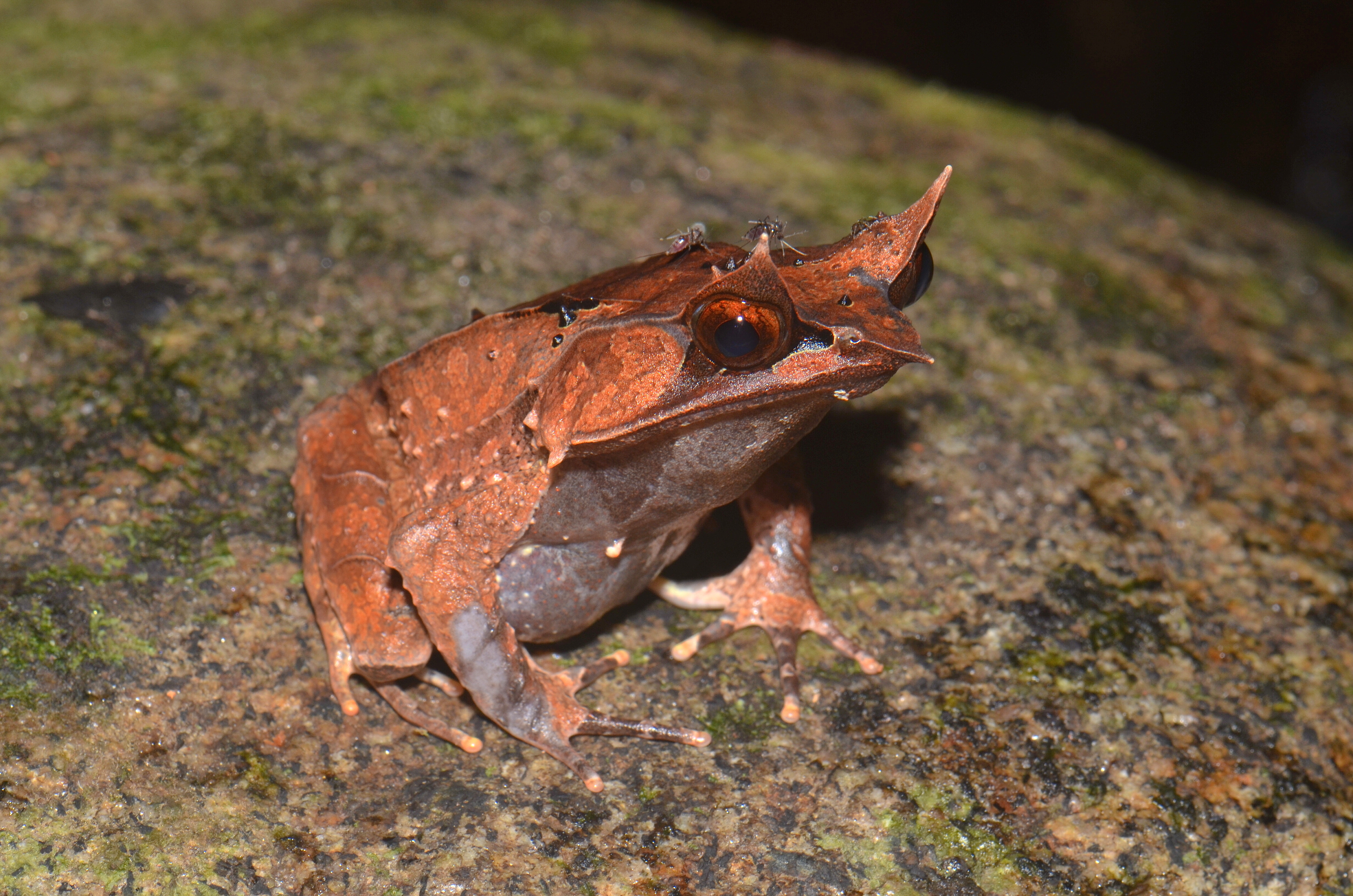
Long-nosed horned frog

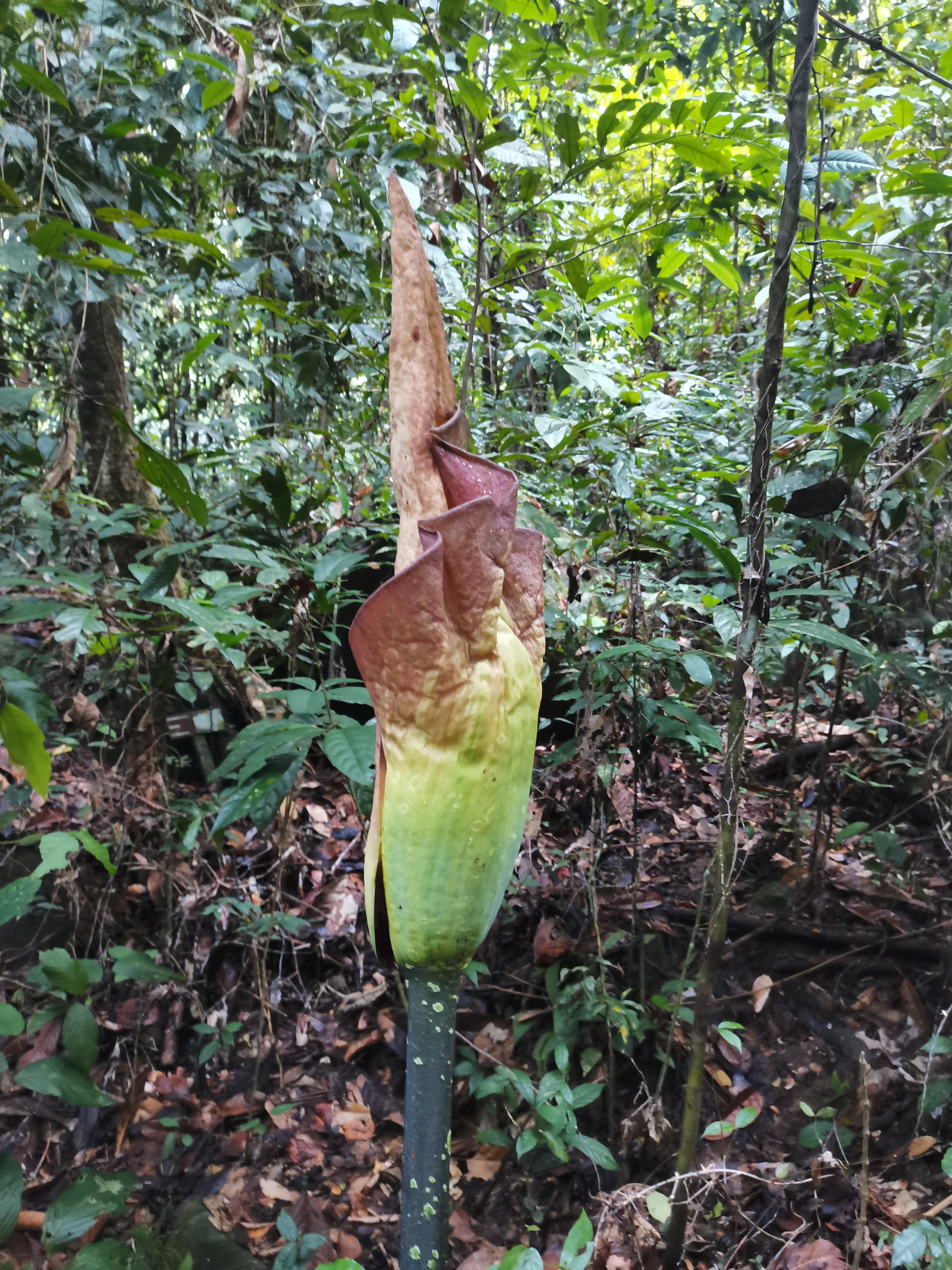
Titan arum
