= Rafflesia tengku-adlinii =

Scientific classification
- Kingdom: Plantae
- Clade: Tracheophytes
- Clade: Angiosperms
- Clade: Eudicots
- Clade: Rosids
- Order: Malpighiales
- Family: Rafflesiaceae
- Genus: Rafflesia
- Species: R. tengku-adlinii

Binomial name
- Rafflesia tengku-adlinii Mat Salleh & Latiff

Species of flowering plant

Rafflesia tengku-adlinii is a parasitic plant species in the genus Rafflesia in the family Rafflesiaceae. It was discovered on Mount Trus Madi in Sabah, Malaysia in 1987. It is one of the medium-sized species, around 50 cm (20 in) wide. The five tepals (perigone lobes) are bright orange, while the corona is reddish-orange. Unlike many Rafflesia species, there are no white or pale markings on the tepals or the corona. Like all Rafflesias, it is parasitic on one or more species of the grape relative Tetrastigma.

This species was named after the conservationist Datuk Dr. Tengku D. Z. Adlin.
