= Rafflesia borneensis =

Scientific classification
- Kingdom: Plantae
- Clade: Tracheophytes
- Clade: Angiosperms
- Clade: Eudicots
- Clade: Rosids
- Order: Malpighiales
- Family: Rafflesiaceae
- Genus: Rafflesia
- Species: R. borneensis

Binomial name
- Rafflesia borneensis Koord.

Species of flowering plant

Rafflesia borneensis is a species of flowering plant in the family Rafflesiaceae.
