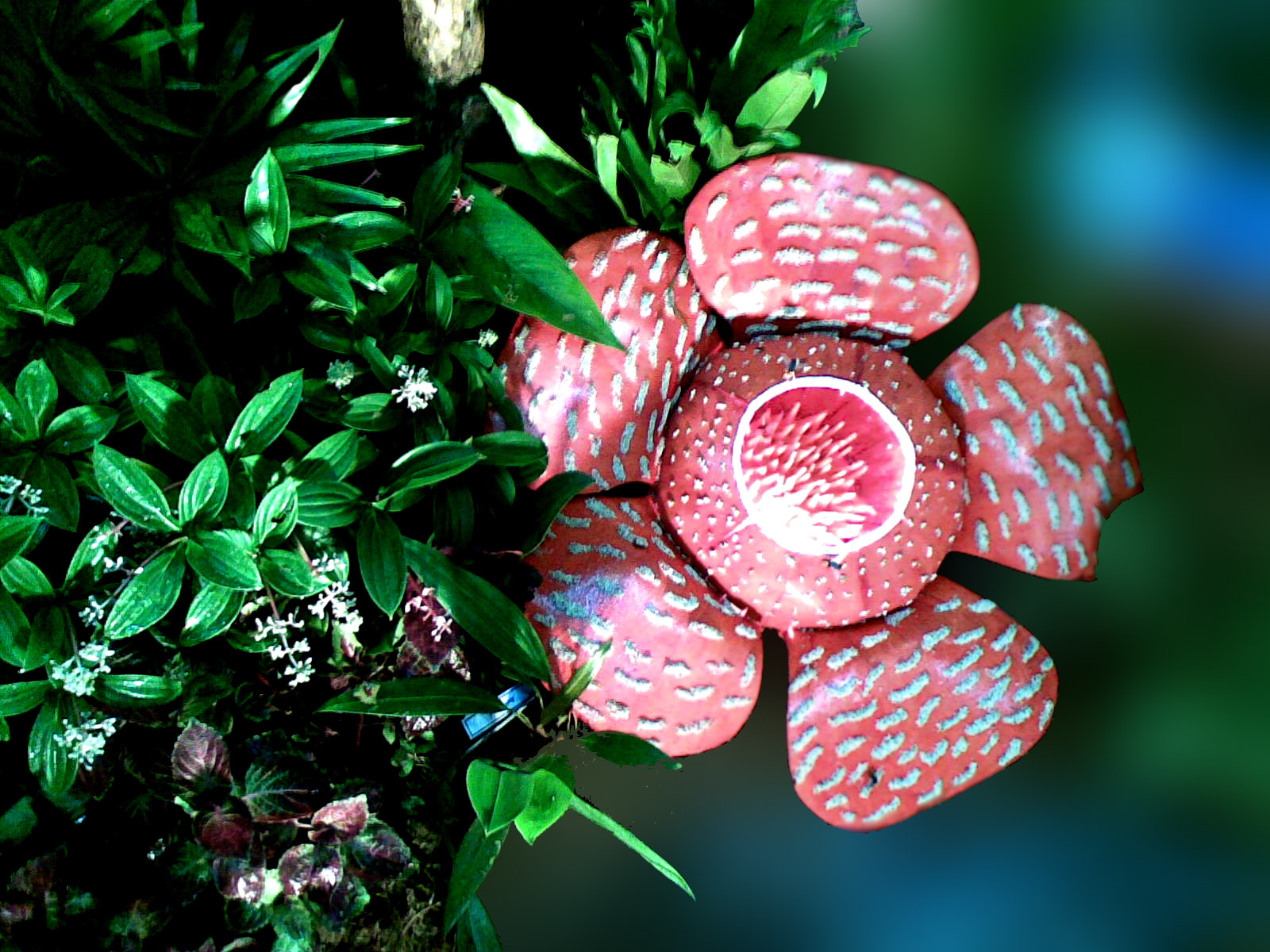

Scientific classification
- Kingdom: Plantae
- Clade: Embryophytes
- Clade: Tracheophytes
- Clade: Spermatophytes
- Clade: Angiosperms
- Clade: Eudicots
- Clade: Rosids
- Order: Malpighiales
- Family: Rafflesiaceae
- Genus: Rafflesia
- Species: R. schadenbergiana

Binomial name
- Rafflesia schadenbergiana (Goepp.) Ferreras

Synonyms
- Rafflesia apoana Goepp.

= Rafflesia schadenbergiana =

Species of flowering plant

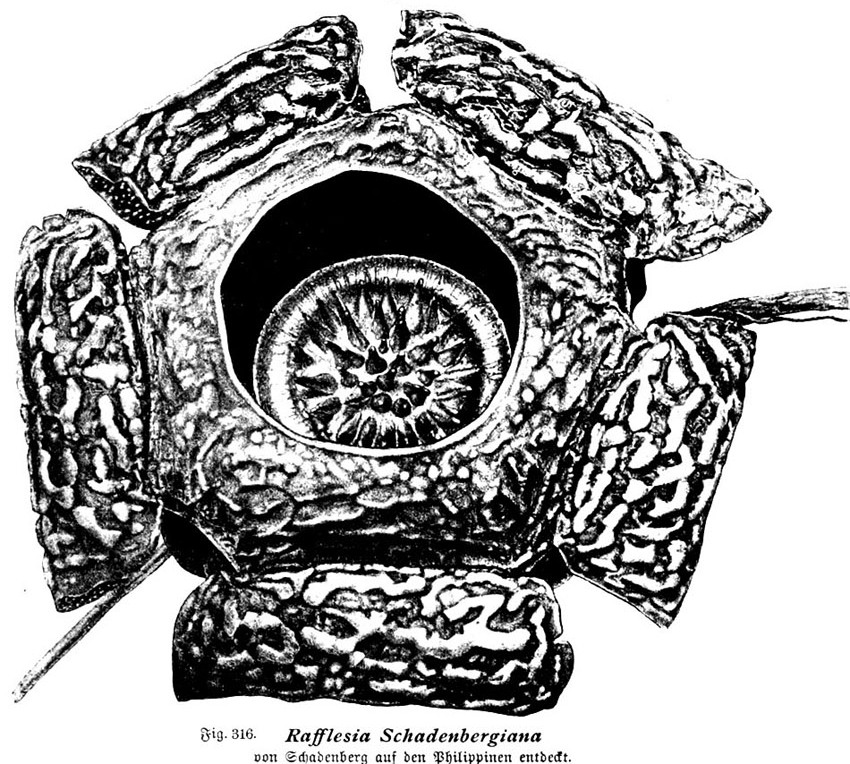
Botanical illustration, 1900

Rafflesia schadenbergiana is a parasitic plant species in the family Rafflesiaceae, endemic to the island of Mindanao in the Philippines. It has the largest flower among the Rafflesia species found in the Philippines, with a diameter of 52–80 cm (20–30 in). It has also the second largest flower in the genus after R. arnoldii.

This species was first collected in the vicinity of Mount Apo on Mindanao, during an expedition led by Alexander Schadenberg and Otto Koch in 1882. It was not seen for more than a century and was assumed to be extinct until Pascal Lays found a specimen of this species in South Cotabato in 1994 while studying the Tasaday people. A population of this rare Rafflesia species was recently discovered in Baungon in Bukidnon province, just outside the buffer zone of the Mount Kitanglad Natural Park in 2007. (Note: For more information about the remarkable species, see the review in the following citation: Barcelona, et al. "Taxonomy, ecology, and conservation status of Philippine Rafflesia (Rafflesiaceae)" Blumea. 54:77-94. doi:10.3767/000651909X474122.)
