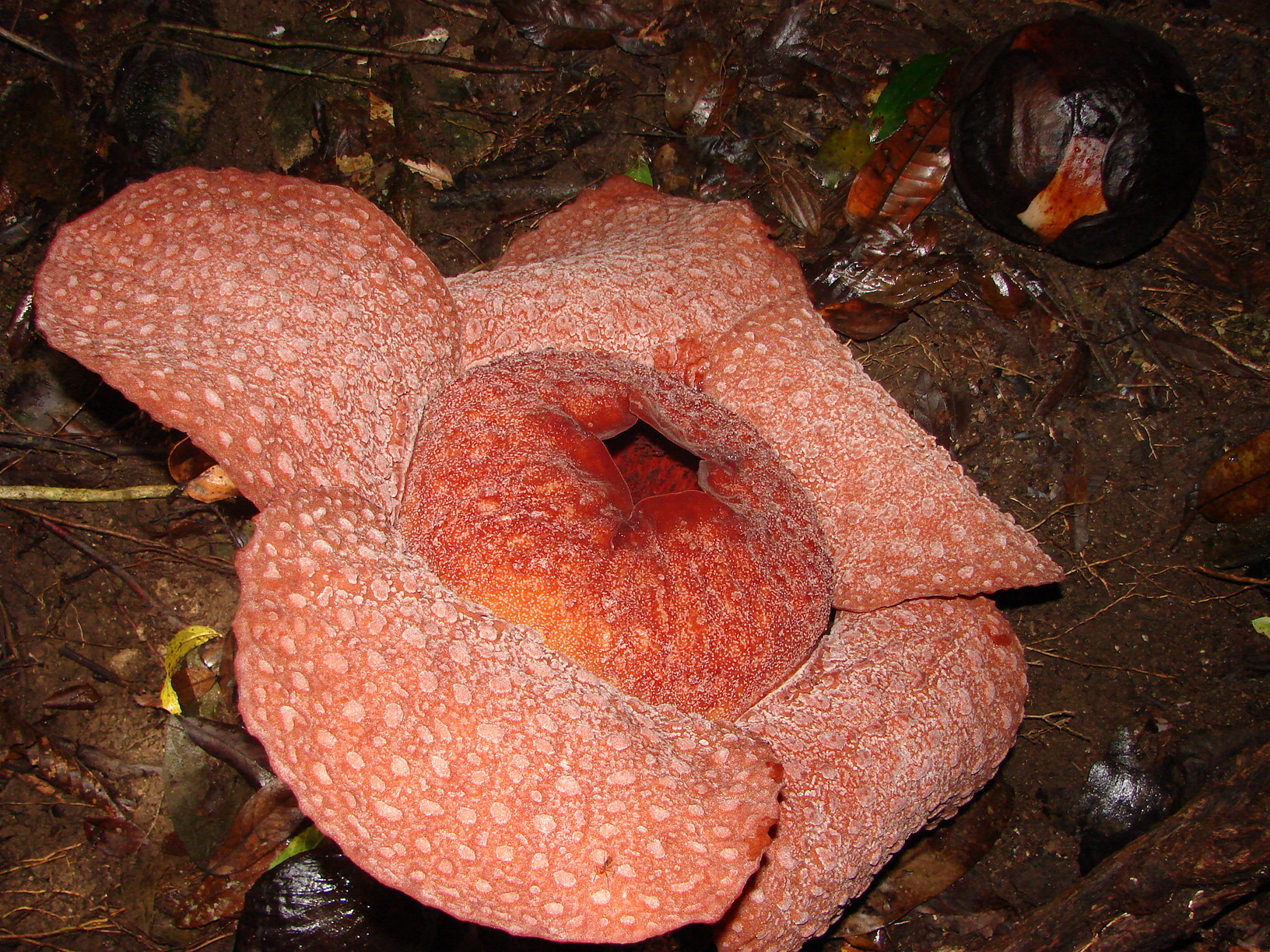

Scientific classification
- Kingdom: Plantae
- Clade: Tracheophytes
- Clade: Angiosperms
- Clade: Eudicots
- Clade: Rosids
- Order: Malpighiales
- Family: Rafflesiaceae
- Genus: Rafflesia
- Species: R. micropylora

Binomial name
- Rafflesia micropylora Meijer

= Rafflesia micropylora =

Species of flowering plant

Rafflesia micropylora is a parasitic plant species of the genus Rafflesia. It is endemic to Sumatra in Indonesia.

This species was named because of the small opening of its diaphragm or corona. The flowers are 30–60 cm diameter, with the diaphragm opening only 3–9 cm diameter, with an angular (rather than smoothly rounded) margin. Unlike the bold markings of species like R. arnoldi, R. micropylora is covered with a myriad of tiny markings. The very small aperture of the corona makes its identification easy.
