= Rafflesia lobata =

Scientific classification
- Kingdom: Plantae
- Clade: Tracheophytes
- Clade: Angiosperms
- Clade: Eudicots
- Clade: Rosids
- Order: Malpighiales
- Family: Rafflesiaceae
- Genus: Rafflesia
- Species: R. lobata

Binomial name
- Rafflesia lobata Galang & Madulid

Species of flowering plant

Rafflesia lobata is a parasitic plant species of the genus Rafflesia. It is endemic to the Philippine island of Panay, particularly the mountains of Antique and Iloilo provinces. This is the second species recorded from the island of Panay. One of the most distinctive features of Rafflesia lobata is that some populations have flowers with a lobed diaphragm that opens outward. Nearly all other Rafflesia (and Sapria) species have diaphragms that curve inward. This feature is polymorphic in R. lobata (at least as the species is currently defined). As shown in the photos below, in some populations the diaphragm curves inward and may be 3- or 6-lobed. Note the 6-lobed flower also has 6 perigone lobes. It remains to be seen whether flower merousity has phylogenetic significance that should be taxonomically recognized. Some populations of R. manillana, such as one at Bolos Point, Cagayan Valley, Luzon, also have flowers with lobed, outwardly curving diaphragms.

The name of the species was derived from its distinctive lobed diaphragm.

The first population of R. lobata was discovered by the local conservation group studying Philippine Spotted Deer (Cervus alfredi).
