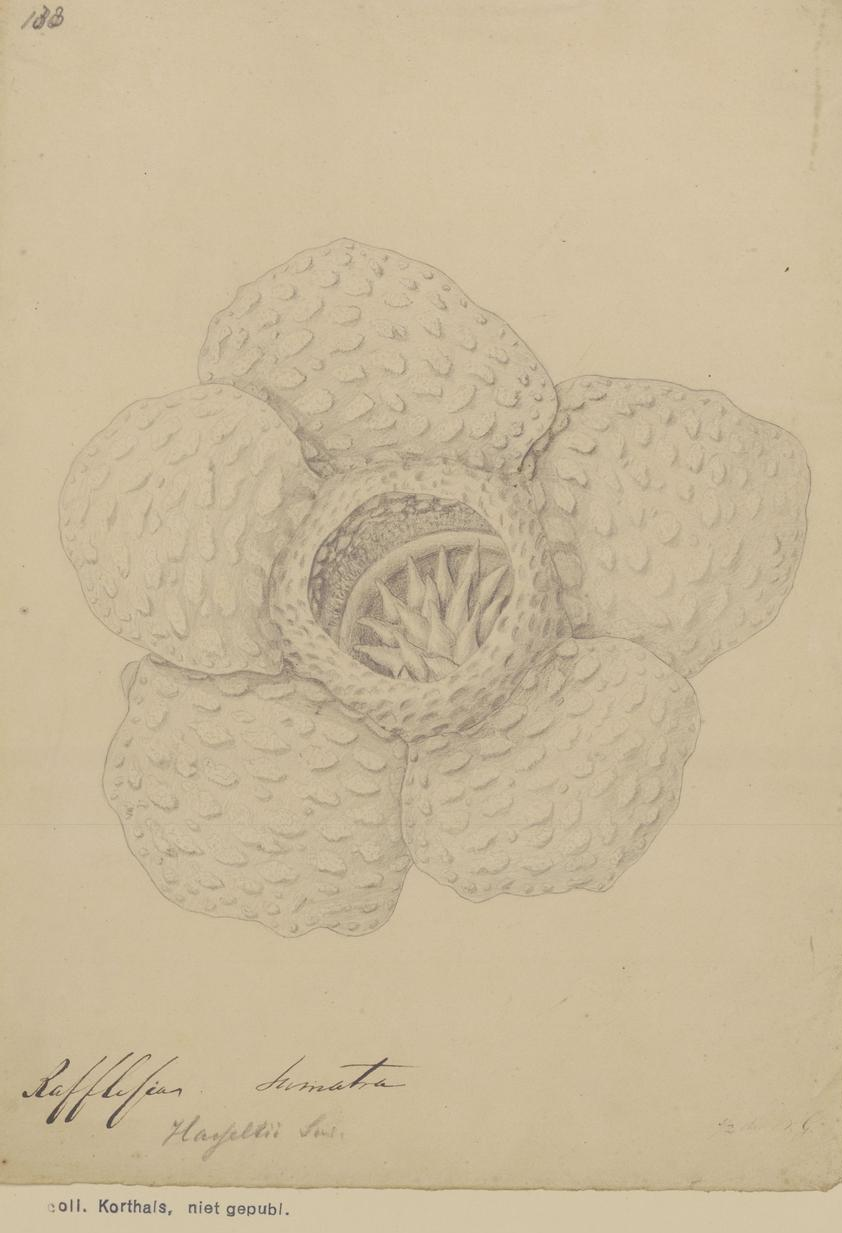

Scientific classification
- Kingdom: Plantae
- Clade: Tracheophytes
- Clade: Angiosperms
- Clade: Eudicots
- Clade: Rosids
- Order: Malpighiales
- Family: Rafflesiaceae
- Genus: Rafflesia
- Species: R. hasseltii

Binomial name
- Rafflesia hasseltii Suringar

= Rafflesia hasseltii =

Species of flowering plant

Rafflesia hasseltii is a parasitic plant species of the genus Rafflesia and the family Rafflesiaceae which is hosted by certain Tetrastigma species. It is native to Sumatra and Peninsular Malaysia. R. hasseltii has by far the widest variation in form, color and pattern of any of the rafflesias.

== Etymology ==
The species epithet hasseltii was given by Dutch botanist Willem Frederik Reinier Suringar in 1879. The origin of the epithet, or whom it attributes to, has not been documented. However, it was likely attributed to fellow Dutch botanist and ethnologist Arend Ludolf van Hasselt, who assisted in collecting the plant specimens from West Coast Sumatra.

R. hasseltii is locally known as tiger-faced mushroom (Malay: cendawan muka rimau), due to its blooming flower's appearance resembles the stripes on a tiger. Although rafflesias have mycelia-like fibers that penetrate their host, they are dicotyledonous plants and not mushrooms. It is also known as white-red rafflesia (Indonesian: raflesia merah putih), copperish mushroom (Malay: cendawan biring), sun mushroom (Latin: fungus solaris), ambai-ambai, kerubut, and pakma.

== Distribution and habitat ==
R. hasseltii can only be found on several locations in Kerinci Seblat National Park, Sumatra, Indonesia, and Peninsular Malaysia, including Taman Negara and Temengor Forest Reserve. The type locality of the species in what is now West Sumatra, where it was first described, had gone extinct as a result of local plantation expansion.

This plant is entirely dependent on host species from the genus Tetrastigma.

== Population and conservation ==
Populations at each location are very small, usually consisting of only a few buds, and many buds die before reaching the flowering stage. R. hasseltii is protected under Indonesian regulations and requires the preservation of primary forest habitat to maintain its population.

== Ecology ==
Several animals such as wild boar, deer, squirrels, and ants have been recorded as contributing to the survival of buds and possibly assisting dispersal through their activities on the forest floor.

== Life cycle ==
Buds of R. hasseltii may require up to nine months to reach bloom, while the flowering stage itself lasts only a few days. This long and vulnerable life cycle makes field monitoring essential.

== Uses ==
Traditional tribes such as the Orang Asli sell the flowers as a folk medicine. In laboratory rat experiments, extracts from the buds of this plant have shown potential in accelerating wound healing.

== 2025 sighting ==
In November 2025, Rafflesia hasseltii was reported to have bloomed again in the Hiring Batang Somi forest, Sijunjung Regency, West Sumatra, after a search lasting around 13 years led by Joko Witono (BRIN), Septian Andriki (conservation activist), and Iswandi (Lembaga Pengelola Hutan Nagari Sumpur Kudus, Sumpur Kudus District Forest Management Agency), together with an international research team. The researchers also watched the flower bloom.

== Gallery ==
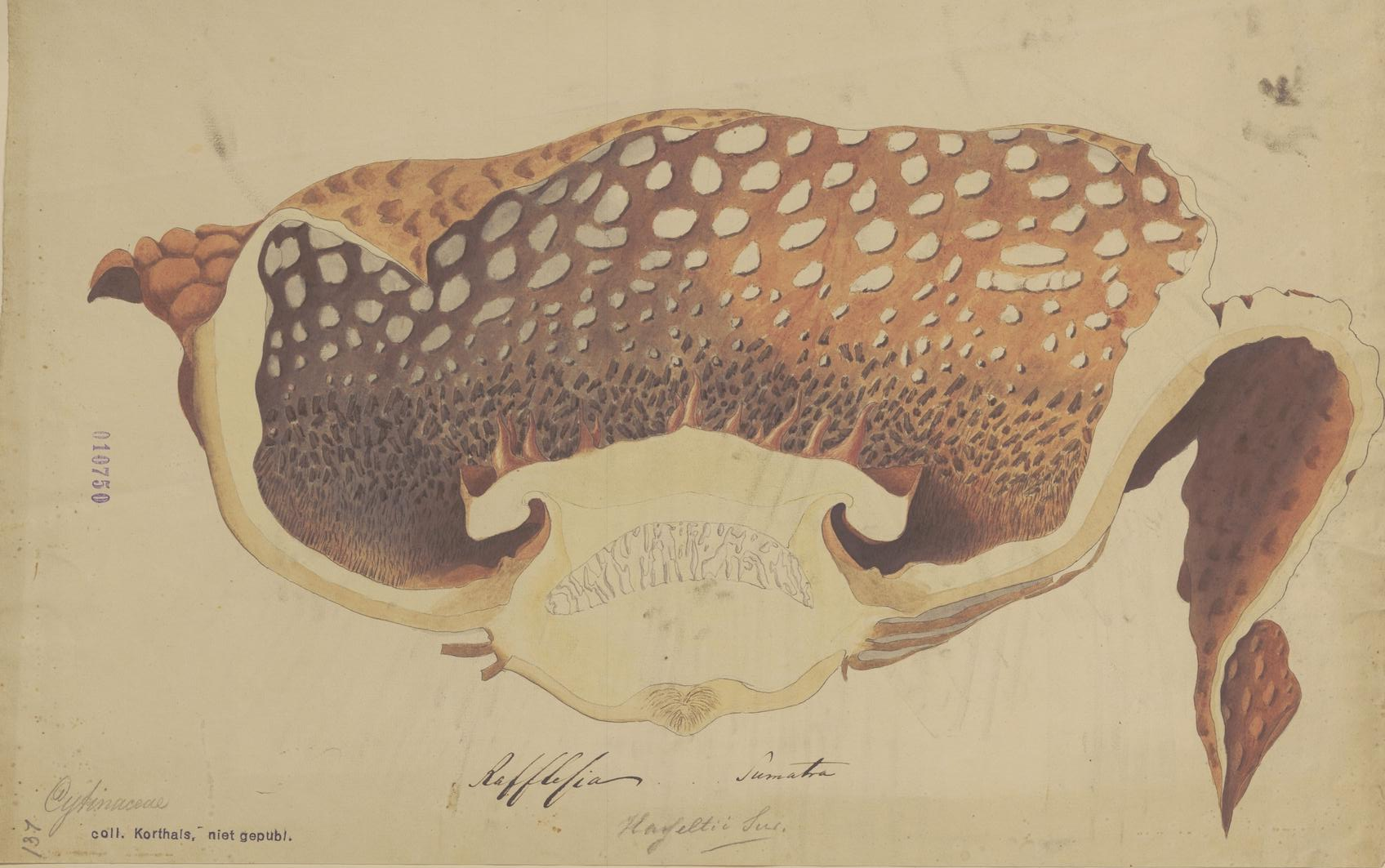
Rafflesia hasseltii, collection Pieter Willem Korthals, Naturalis

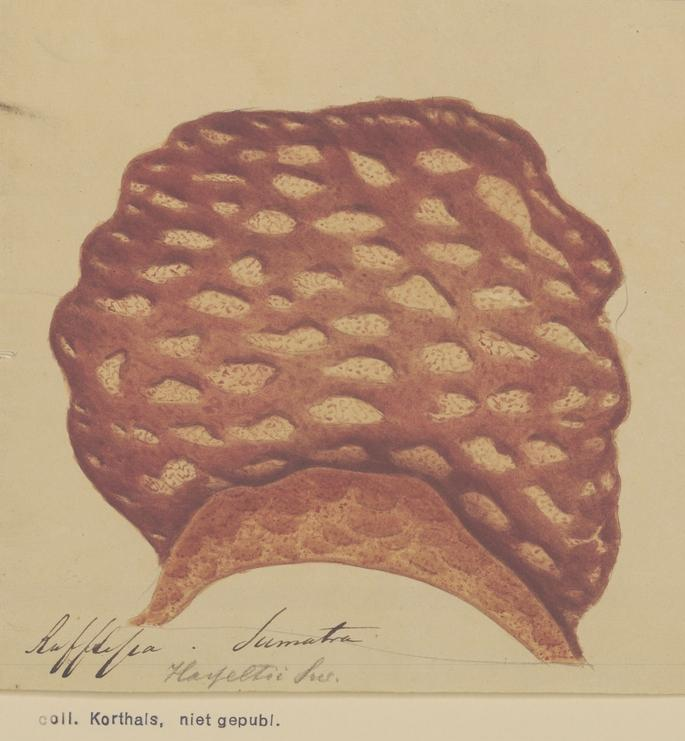
Rafflesia hasseltii, collection Pieter Willem Korthals, Naturalis
