= Rafflesia leonardi =

Scientific classification
- Kingdom: Plantae
- Clade: Embryophytes
- Clade: Tracheophytes
- Clade: Angiosperms
- Clade: Eudicots
- Clade: Rosids
- Order: Malpighiales
- Family: Rafflesiaceae
- Genus: Rafflesia
- Species: R. leonardi

Binomial name
- Rafflesia leonardi Barcelona & Pelser

Synonyms
- Rafflesia banaoana Malabrigo

Species of flowering plant

Rafflesia leonardi is a parasitic plant species of the genus Rafflesia. It is endemic to the Philippines. Rafflesia banaoana is considered to be a synonym by some sources, but is recognized as a separate species by others. R. leonardi is the fourth Rafflesia species found in Luzon and the eighth from the Philippines. It is called ngaratngat by the local Agta tribesmen.

The species was discovered in May 2008 by Cagayan Valley Partners in People Development (Cavapped), a multi-sectoral group of environmental scientists at remote sitio Kinapawan in the coastal town of Lal-Lo, Cagayan.

Rafflesia leonardi was named by Julie Barcelona and colleagues after Filipino botanist Dr. Leonardo Co of Conservation International. See this citation for a review of Philippine Rafflesia.
