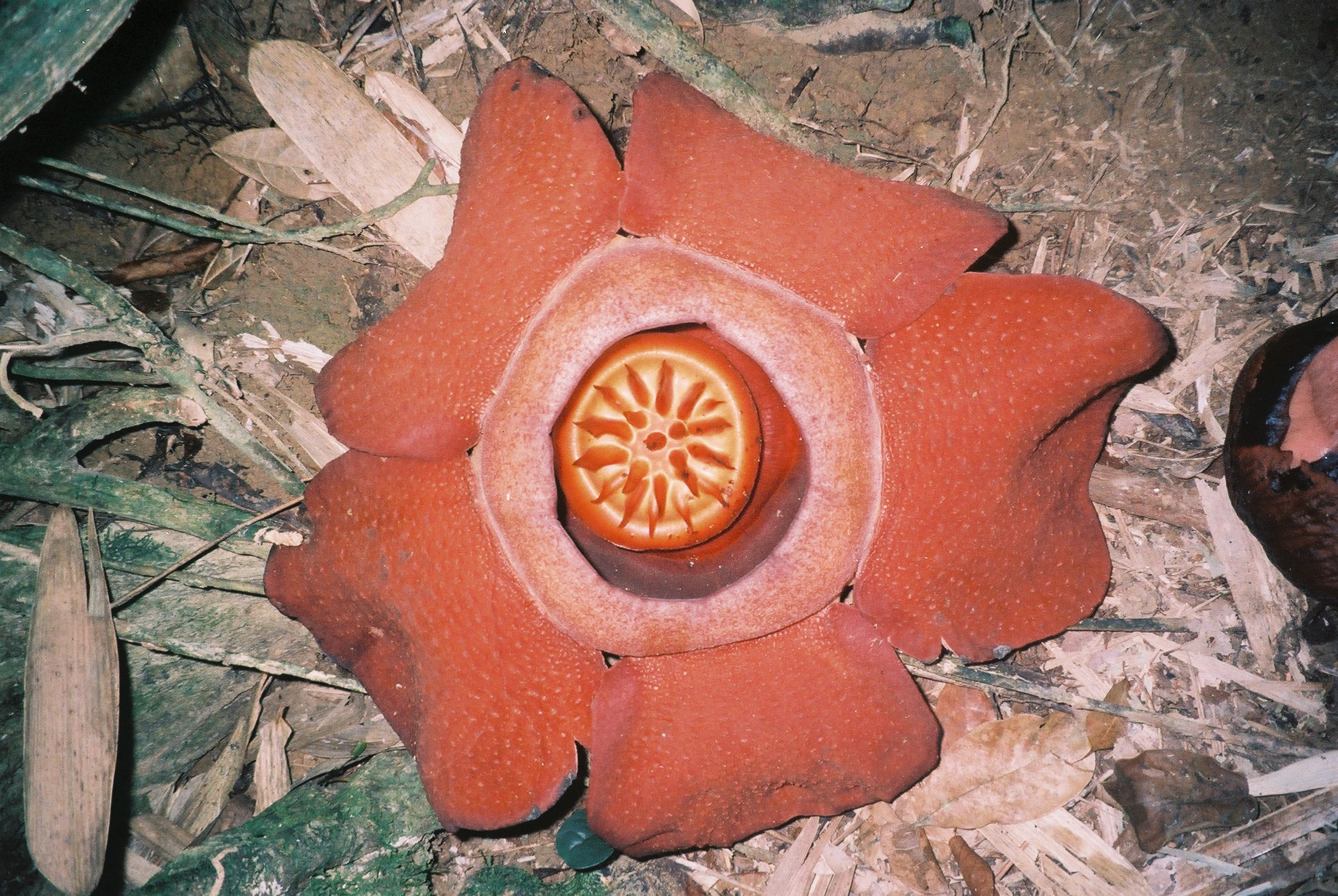

Scientific classification
- Kingdom: Plantae
- Clade: Embryophytes
- Clade: Tracheophytes
- Clade: Angiosperms
- Clade: Eudicots
- Clade: Rosids
- Order: Malpighiales
- Family: Rafflesiaceae
- Genus: Rafflesia
- Species: R. kerrii

Binomial name
- Rafflesia kerrii Meijer

= Rafflesia kerrii =

Species of flowering plant

Rafflesia kerrii is a member of the genus Rafflesia of the small parasitic family Rafflesiaceae. It is found in the rainforest of southern Thailand and peninsular Malaysia, with notable populations in Khao Sok National Park and Khlong Phanom National Park. Local Thai names are บัวผุด (bua phut), ย่านไก่ต้ม (yan kai tom) and บัวตูม (bua tum).

The red flowers typically have a diameter of 50–90 cm (19 1/2–35 1/2 in) and smell awfully of rotten meat to attract flies for pollination. This species has some claim to being the world's largest flower, for although the average size of R. arnoldii is greater than the average R. kerrii, there have been two recent specimens of R. kerrii of exceptional size; one specimen found in the Lojing Highlands of peninsular Malaysia on 7 April 2004 by Prof. Dr. Kamarudin Mat-Salleh, and his associate Mat Ros, measured 111 cm (43 1/2 in) in width, while another found in 2007 in Kelantan State, peninsular Malaysia by Dr. Gan Canglin measured 112 cm (44 in). The plant is a parasite to the wild grapes of the genus Tetrastigma (T. leucostaphylum, T. papillosum and T. quadrangulum), but only the flowers are visible. The remainder of the plant is a network of fibres penetrating all of the tissues of the Tetrastigma; these fibres, although Angiosperm in nature, closely resemble a fungal mycelium. Small buds appear along the lianas and roots of the host, which after nine months open as giant flowers. After just one week the flower wilts. The species flowers seasonally, with flowers only reported during the dry season, from January to March, and more rarely till July.

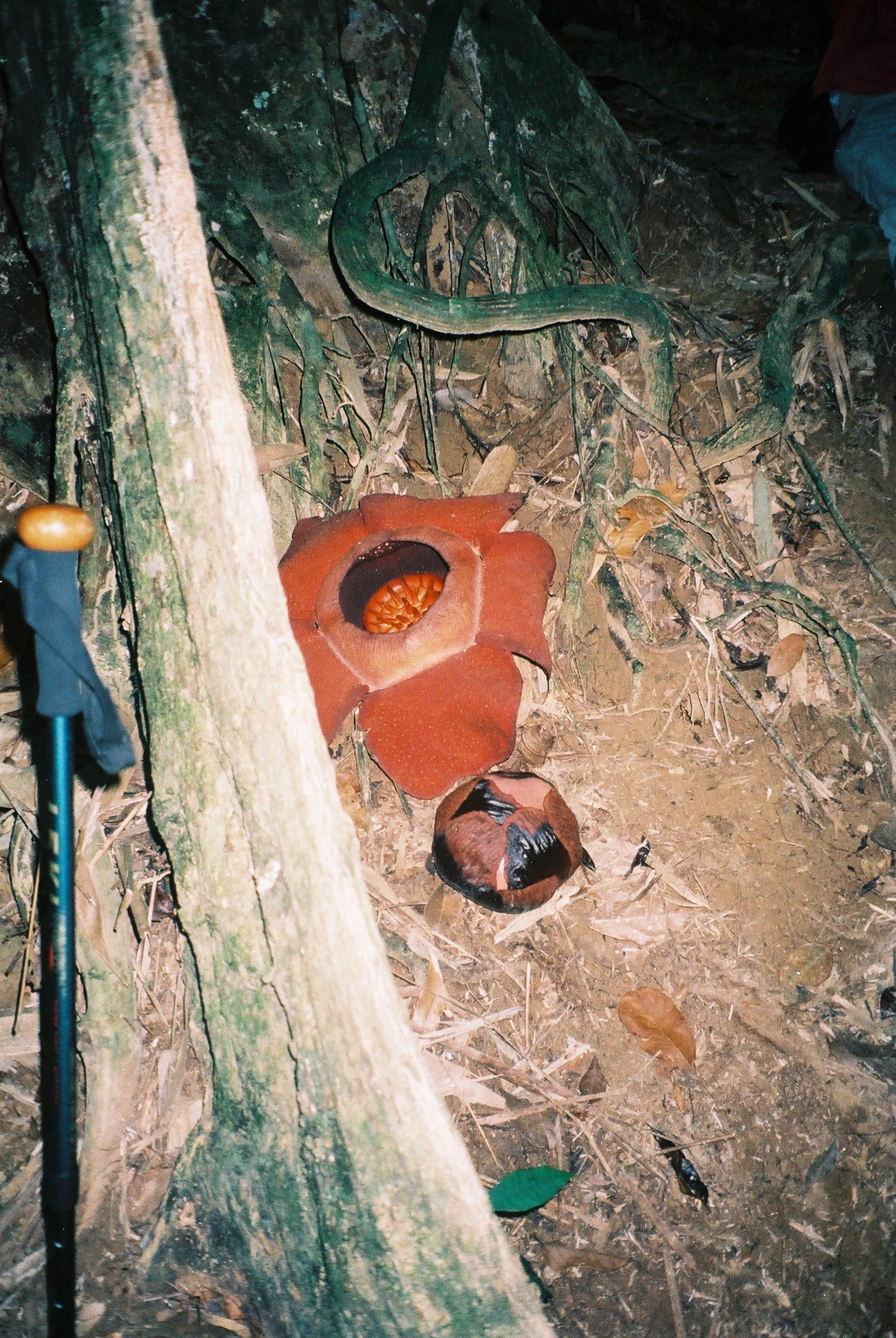
Flower and bud in Khao Sok National Park

The flower is endangered. Though already naturally rare, tourists trying to get close to the flower for photos easily trample the host plant or young buds. Also the locals collect both buds and flowers both as a delicacy as well as for its claimed medical powers. A concoction of cooked buds or flowers is used as a general tonic, to help for fever or backache or even as a sexual stimulant. However, there is a lack of evidence regarding the efficacy of the flower for treating any medical condition. The flower is the symbol flower of Surat Thani Province, which is the location of the Khao Sok NP. The five "petals", formerly called "perigon lobes" have now been identified by a Harvard research team as true sepals and the corona is now seen as a combination of a true corona, as seen in Sapria with the five connate true petals.

== Discovery ==
The species is named after the Irish botanist, Arthur Francis George Kerr, who collected plants extensively in Thailand. It was Kerr who first collected a specimen of this species in 1927, and a further three by 1929. The specimen later used as the type specimen was collected on 3 February 1929 at Khao Pho Ta Luang Kaeo near Ranong. It was scientifically collected several times afterwards, believed to be R. patma. In 1984 Willem Meijer described it as a separate species.

== Bibliography ==
- National Park, Wildlife and Plant Conservation Department, National Park Bulletin June–July 2004 (1.8 MB PDF)
- Jamili Nais. Rafflesia of the World. ISBN 983-812-042-1. pp. 147–153
