= Rafflesia rochussenii =

Scientific classification
- Kingdom: Plantae
- Clade: Tracheophytes
- Clade: Angiosperms
- Clade: Eudicots
- Clade: Rosids
- Order: Malpighiales
- Family: Rafflesiaceae
- Genus: Rafflesia
- Species: R. rochussenii

Binomial name
- Rafflesia rochussenii Teijsm. & Binnend.

Species of flowering plant

Rafflesia rochussenii is a parasitic plant species of the genus Rafflesia. It is endemic to the Indonesian island of Java.
