= Rafflesia manillana =

Scientific classification
- Kingdom: Plantae
- Clade: Tracheophytes
- Clade: Angiosperms
- Clade: Eudicots
- Clade: Rosids
- Order: Malpighiales
- Family: Rafflesiaceae
- Genus: Rafflesia
- Species: R. manillana

Binomial name
- Rafflesia manillana Teschem.

Synonyms
- Rafflesia lagascae Blanco; Rafflesia cumingii R.Br. Rafflesia panchoana Madulid, Tandang & Agoo

Species of flowering plant

Rafflesia manillana is a parasitic plant species of the genus Rafflesia. It is endemic to the Philippines.

This species was named after the city of Manila.

Rafflesia panchoana, described in 2007, which used to be considered a heterotypic synonym of R. manillana, is now regarded as a synonym for R. lagascae.
