= Rafflesia verrucosa =

Scientific classification
- Kingdom: Plantae
- Clade: Tracheophytes
- Clade: Angiosperms
- Clade: Eudicots
- Clade: Rosids
- Order: Malpighiales
- Family: Rafflesiaceae
- Genus: Rafflesia
- Species: R. verrucosa

Binomial name
- Rafflesia verrucosa Balete, Pelser, Nickrent & Barcelona
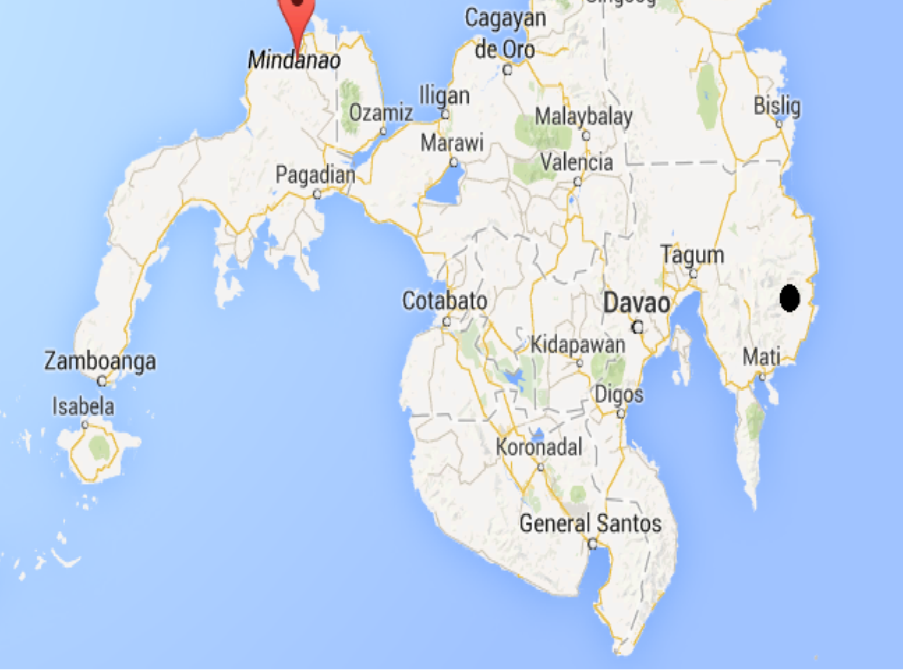
- Rafflesia verrucosa distribution

Species of plant

Rafflesia verrucosa was first identified and characterized during a small mammal survey of Mt. Kampalili in eastern Mindanao in 2010. R. verrucosa is the tenth species of Rafflesia found in the Philippines. Rafflesia species have rare and unusual flowers known for their large size and pungent smell. Some plant enthusiasts like Frits W. Went have gone to extreme measures to see these plants in bloom. Went detailed his search for Rafflesia saying,

"I had heard, when I was in Java many years ago, that Rafflesia were to be found on an offshore island named Nusah Kembangan. This was in 1929, when it was a penal colony for major criminals. My driver on this occasion was a convicted murderer, and my guide was serving time for cannibalism."

The small size and interesting morphology of Rafflesia verrucosa make it one of the most unusual Rafflesia species. It is the smallest flowered Rafflesia species described from Mindanao. The other two, R. mira and R. schadenbergiana, are some of the largest in the genus.

== Etymology ==
The epithet verrucosa comes from the Latin word verruca, which means wart. This name was given due to the unique, raised warts on the lobes and diaphragm of the plant.

== Description ==
Rafflesia verrucosa has very distinctive raised warts on its perigone lobes and diaphragm. The warts are non-uniform in shape or size. The warts extend to the diaphragm rim of the plant; this characteristic is unique to R. verrucosa, while all other Rafflesia species lack warts on their diaphragms. Another unique characteristic of R. verrucosa is the anastomosing plate-like processes on the plants disk. The hair like ramenta are longer (7 mm) when compared to other small Rafflesia. Compared to other smaller-sized Rafflesia, the anther number of R. verrucosa is much greater (20-21). The anthers size and disk size are also both small.

One unique morphological feature of R. verrucosa is its monoecious or bisexual nature. The only other reported bisexual species in this genus is Rafflesia baletei. R. baletei has male and female flowers that contain vestigial structures of the opposite sex. Further studies will be needed to conclude if the species is a functional bisexual.

== Distribution and habitat ==
Rafflesia verrucosa has been found only growing on the southeastern slope of Mt. Kampalili in the Davao Oriental Province of Mindanao. The plant can be found between 1350 and 1550 m. in elevation even though the Tetrastigma vines that the plant grow on can be found at a greater range of elevations.

The R. verrucosa specimens were found in a montane forest, which had a relatively rocky, sloping terrain. Leaf litter depth at the site was ca. 2–5 cm. deep, and canopy height was about 15 m tall. Mosses were common on tree trunks and branches around the flowers. Understory vegetation in montane forests is dense, and is composed of ferns, lycophytes, ground orchids, gingers and grasses. Canopy vines are very common in these sorts of areas.

== Ecology ==
Rafflesia verrucosa was found growing on only the roots of the Tetrastigma vines. Some buds were found growing from roots that were 7 cm. under soil. In the area it was found, the spatial density of R. verrucosa was around 7-8 flower clusters per hectare. The peak flowering season is likely through October to December, but flowering might persist intermittently year round. The reproductive style of R. verrucosa is probably similar to other Rafflesia species.

The impact of various mammals on the herbivory and dispersal is unknown. Trapping around verrucosa flower clusters revealed several small mammal species including gymnures, shrews, tree shrews, shrew-mice, moss mice, tree mice, forest mice, the large Mindanao forest rat and a Philippine forest rat. Larger mammals have also been seen in the surrounding area. The Philippine warty pig was seen trampling some of the R. verrucosa flowers, but they were not seen eating the fruits. In Borneo smaller mammals such as squirrels and the tree shrew eat Rafflesia fruits.

== Conservation ==
The montane forest in which R. verrucosa is found, has become increasingly disturbed and fragmented by the abaca textile industry. Another threat to R. verrucosa habitat is the practice of cutting down rattan palms for their heart of palm. This processes destroys vast areas of forest. Up until now, Mt. Kampalili has been relatively undisturbed by these impacts. R. verrucosa populations can continue to be stable if portions of Mt. Kampalili remain unchanged.
