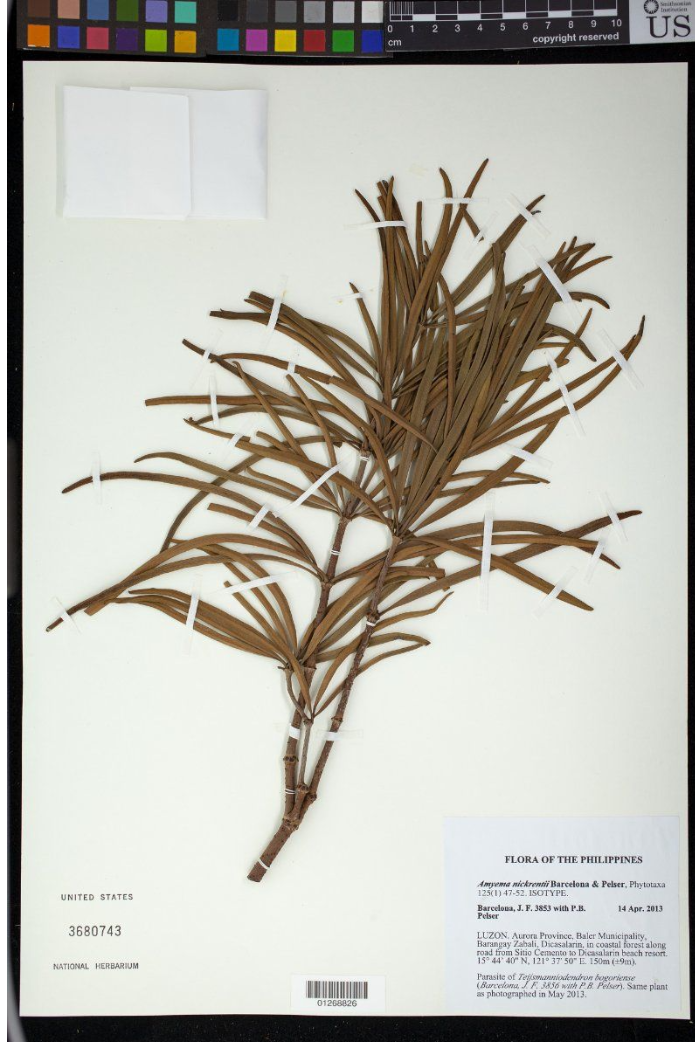
- A. nickrentii found on a Teijsmanniodendron bogoriense in Dicasalarin

Scientific classification
- Kingdom: Plantae
- Clade: Tracheophytes
- Clade: Angiosperms
- Clade: Eudicots
- Order: Santalales
- Family: Loranthaceae
- Genus: Amyema
- Species: A. nickrentii

Binomial name
- Amyema nickrentii Barcelona & Pelser

= Amyema nickrentii =

Species of epiphyte

Amyema nickrentii is an epiphytic, flowering, hemiparasitic plant of the family Loranthaceae native to the Philippines. It was found in coastal forest in the Aurora Province and "differs from all other described Amyema species in having a whorled leaf arrangement with mostly nine flat linear leaves per node".

== Taxonomy ==
It was first described by Julie Barcelona & Pieter Pelser in 2013. The specific epithet, nickrentii, honours Daniel Lee Nickrent.
