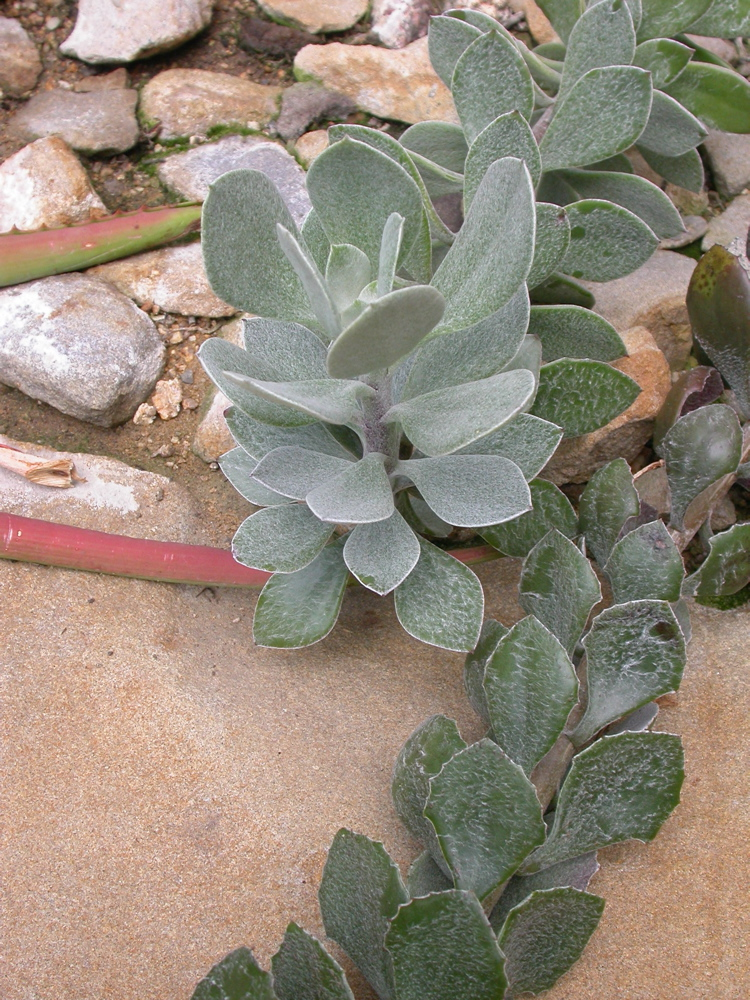

Scientific classification
- Kingdom: Plantae
- Clade: Tracheophytes
- Clade: Angiosperms
- Clade: Eudicots
- Clade: Asterids
- Order: Asterales
- Family: Asteraceae
- Genus: Caputia
- Species: C. medley-woodii

Binomial name
- Caputia medley-woodii (Hutch.) B.Nord. & Pelser

Synonyms
- Senecio medley-woodii Hutch.

= Caputia medley-woodii =

Species of flowering plant

Caputia medley-woodii is a species of flowering plant in the sunflower family, Asteraceae.
