= Cyne (disambiguation) =

Cyne is an American hip hop group.

Cyne may also refer to:

- Cyne (plant)
- Norway House Airport, Manitoba, Canada, IATA code CYNE
