= Cyne quadriangula =

Scientific classification
- Kingdom: Plantae
- Clade: Tracheophytes
- Clade: Angiosperms
- Clade: Eudicots
- Order: Santalales
- Family: Loranthaceae
- Genus: Cyne
- Species: C. quadriangula

Binomial name
- Cyne quadriangula Danser
- Neotype site:Region XIII (Caraga), Surigao del Norte Province, Bucas Grande Island

Species of flowering plant

Cyne quadriangula is a species of parasitic plant belonging to the family Loranthaceae, and was first described in 1935 by Benedictus Hubertus Danser.

The type specimen having been lost, a new type specimen was given in 2022 by Daniel Nickrent and Mark Rule, together with a redescription, images, and an explanation of the need for a neotype.

It is native to the Philippines, where it is found on Mindanao, and on Bucas Grande Island, growing in the wet tropical biome, at low elevations (17 m.). Recorded host genera are Myrsine, Timonius, and Antirhea.
