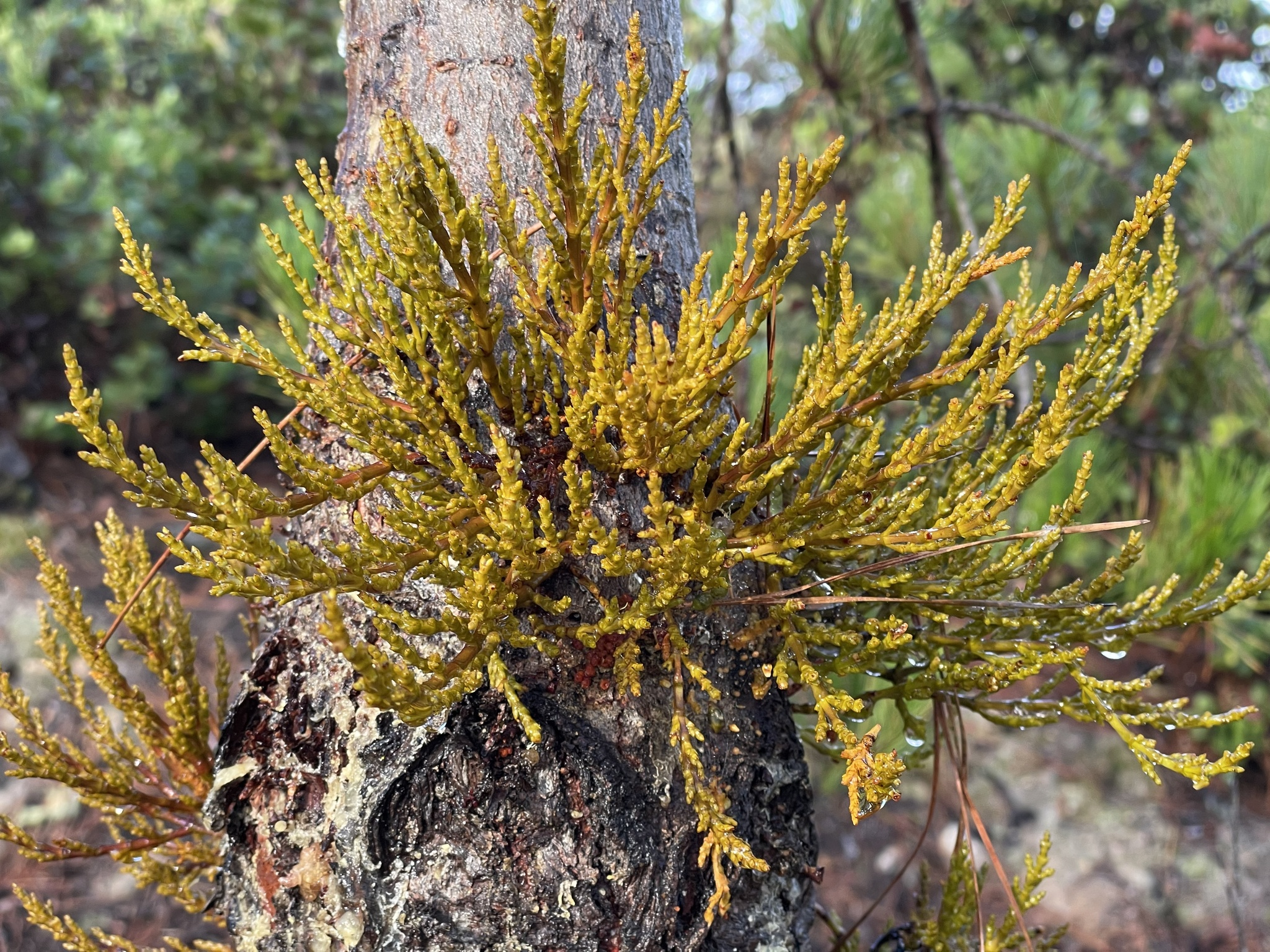

Scientific classification
- Kingdom: Plantae
- Clade: Embryophytes
- Clade: Tracheophytes
- Clade: Spermatophytes
- Clade: Angiosperms
- Clade: Eudicots
- Order: Santalales
- Family: Santalaceae
- Genus: Arceuthobium
- Species: A. littorum

Binomial name
- Arceuthobium littorum Hawksw., Wiens & Nickrent

Synonyms
- Arceuthobium campylopodum subsp. littorum (Hawksw., Wiens & Nickrent) Nickrent

= Arceuthobium littorum =

Species of dwarf mistletoe

Arceuthobium littorum is a species of dwarf mistletoe known as coastal dwarf mistletoe. It is endemic to the coastline of northern California, where it lives as a parasite on Bishop pine and Monterey pine trees, and occasionally on Bolander's pine. This species significantly impacts the ecology of coastal pine forests, negatively affecting the health of host trees but providing important habitat and food for other organisms.

== Description ==
Like other dwarf mistletoes, A. littorum grows on and parasitizes conifers. The principal hosts of A. littorum are Bishop pine (Pinus muricata) and Monterey pine (Pinus radiata), meaning that A. littorum shows a strong preference for infecting these hosts over other conifer species; Bolander's pine (Pinus contorta var. bolanderi) is an occasional host. Moreover, A. littorum is the only species in its genus known to infect any of these three pines.

For the first few years of its life, a dwarf mistletoe plant grows entirely within a young branch of the host tree, developing a system of tissues called haustoria to extract water and nutrients from the tree's xylem and phloem, respectively. Eventually, A. littorum sends out a network of aerial stems, which range from 5 to 22 cm in length, but most are 10 cm long. These shoots are flabellately branched, dark green, greenish brown, or yellow-green in color, and bear small, scale-like leaves. Although the stems contain chlorophyll, A. littorum photosynthesizes at a low rate, relying on its host for the vast majority of its carbohydrates.

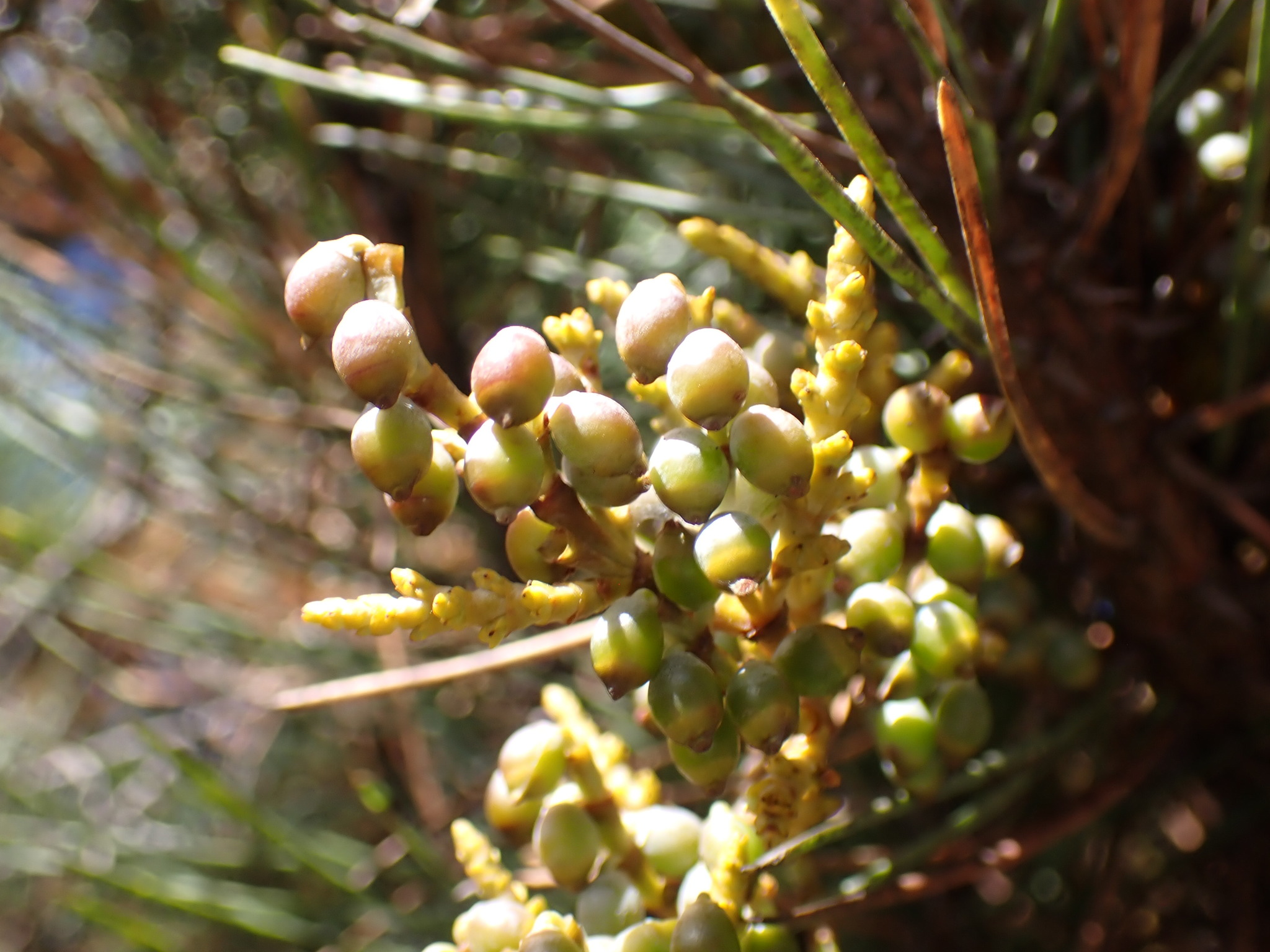
The fruit of A. littorum are notably rounder than that of related species and range in color from green to red.

Dwarf mistletoes are dioecious, meaning that A. littorum plants produce either male (staminate) or female (pistillate) flowers. The male flowers are 3.5–5.7 mm in diameter and predominantly 4-petaled, although flowers with 3 or 5 petals are also common; the presence of 5-merous flowers is a key morphological difference between A. littorum and the closely-related mistletoe species A. occidentale. Flowers bloom in August and September, and fruit take an average of 14 months to mature after pollination. The mature fruit is a green or red berry, approximately 4–5 mm long, and almost as wide as long, unlike most species of dwarf mistletoe which produce more narrowly oblong berries. Peak seed dispersal occurs in September and October, when hydrostatic pressure inside the berry ejects the seed at an initial velocity of approximately 100 km/h, and a sticky coating called viscin helps the seeds adhere to branches or foliage of potential host trees they strike.

== Ecology ==
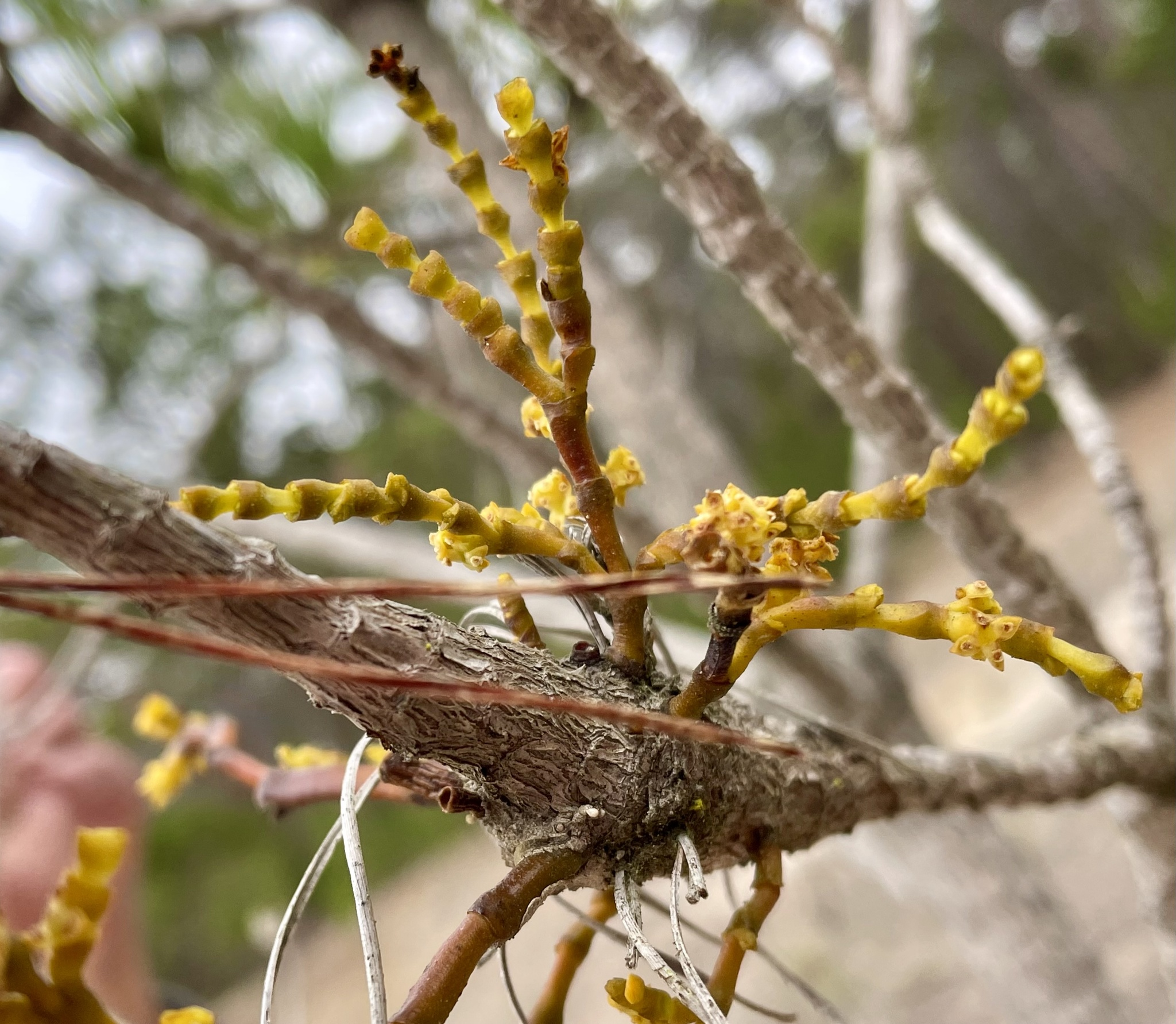
Swelling on host plants is common at the point of infection by A. littorum.

Infection by A. littorum negatively impacts the health of host trees. For example, hosts display decreased longevity, lower reproductive rates, and increased susceptibility to infection by fungal pathogens compared to uninfected trees.

Abnormal growth patterns by the host is a common outcome of infection by A. littorum, typically characterized by the formation of large, nonsystemic witch's brooms. The formation of brooms in host trees infected by A. littorum was originally used to separate A. littorum from A. occidentale. Broom formation increases the availability of nutrients to the mistletoe but results in decreased vigor, lower seed production, and increased mortality for the host. While broom formation disadvantages the host tree, the brooms are ecologically significant as they provide unique nesting habitats and cover for small mammals and birds.

Dwarf mistletoes in general have been identified as a food source for several species of arthropods, birds, and mammals. For example, the scale insect Hemiberlesia rapax, the plant bug Neoborella tumida, and unidentified geometer moths have been documented feeding on A. littorum. As larvae, several species of hairstreak butterflies (Callophrys) feed only on mistletoes in the Campylopoda group to which A. littorum belongs; however, none have been documented on A. littorum.

== Distribution ==
A. littorum has a coastal distribution, growing in closed-cone conifer forests at elevations from sea level to 300 m. Its distribution, consisting of scattered populations ranging from Fort Bragg in the north to Cambria in the south, is narrower than that of either of its primary hosts. Although A. littorum is considered rare throughout its range, it is likely that many undiscovered populations exist on private property.

Along with A. californicum and A. occidentale, this is one of three species of mistletoe endemic to California. Notably, A. littorum is not sypmatric with other species of dwarf mistletoe, meaning that it is the only species in its genus throughout its range.

Pleistocene fossils of dwarf mistletoe fossils described by Chaney and Mason in 1933 from three coastal sites in California were later identified as A. littorum. One of these sites, near Tomales Bay, still supports a population of the species 30,000–40,000 years later; the other two sites (Carpinteria and Santa Cruz Island) lie outside the modern range of A. littorum.

== Taxonomy ==
A. littorum was previously considered conspecific with A. occidentale but was described as a separate species in 1992. The type specimen of A. littorum was collected by Robert Mathiasenin in 1989, near Noyo, California. The epithet littorum refers to the coastal distribution of the species.

A. littorum belongs to a clade of dwarf mistletoes called Section Campylopoda, in which species boundaries are controversial and difficult to discern. Since 1960, some botanists, including Job Kuijt, have advocated treating the entire section as a single, highly-variable species. Morphometric analyses, comparing color, branching patterns, spike measurements, and flower structure, have been used to differentiate A. littorum from other species in Section Campylopoda, including the closely-related A. occidentale and A. siskiyouense. In 1990, shortly before A. littorum was formally described, isozyme analysis of taxa in Section Campylopoda led Nickrent and Butler to conclude that A. littorum was genetically distinct from both A. campylopodum and A. occidentale. On the other hand, phylogenetic work from 2012 comparing nuclear ribosomal ITS and chloroplast sequences of dwarf mistletoes showed little genetic differentiation between most members of Section Campylopoda, calling into question whether taxa in Section Campylopoda represent distinct species or merely subspecies of a single highly-variable species.

Because there is a lack of consensus on (sub)specific boundaries in Section Campylopoda, taxonomic authorities differ in their treatment of A. littorum. Plants of the World Online considers A. littorum a distinct species, largely following a framework advocated by Mathiasen and Kenaley. The Flora of North America treats the taxon instead at the subspecific level, using the name A. campylopodum subsp. littorum, following Nickrent's interpretation of Campylopoda as comprising one variable species with several host-specific subspecies. In contrast, The Jepson Manual considers A. littorum a synonym of A. campylopodum, along with all other members of Section Campylopoda native to California.
