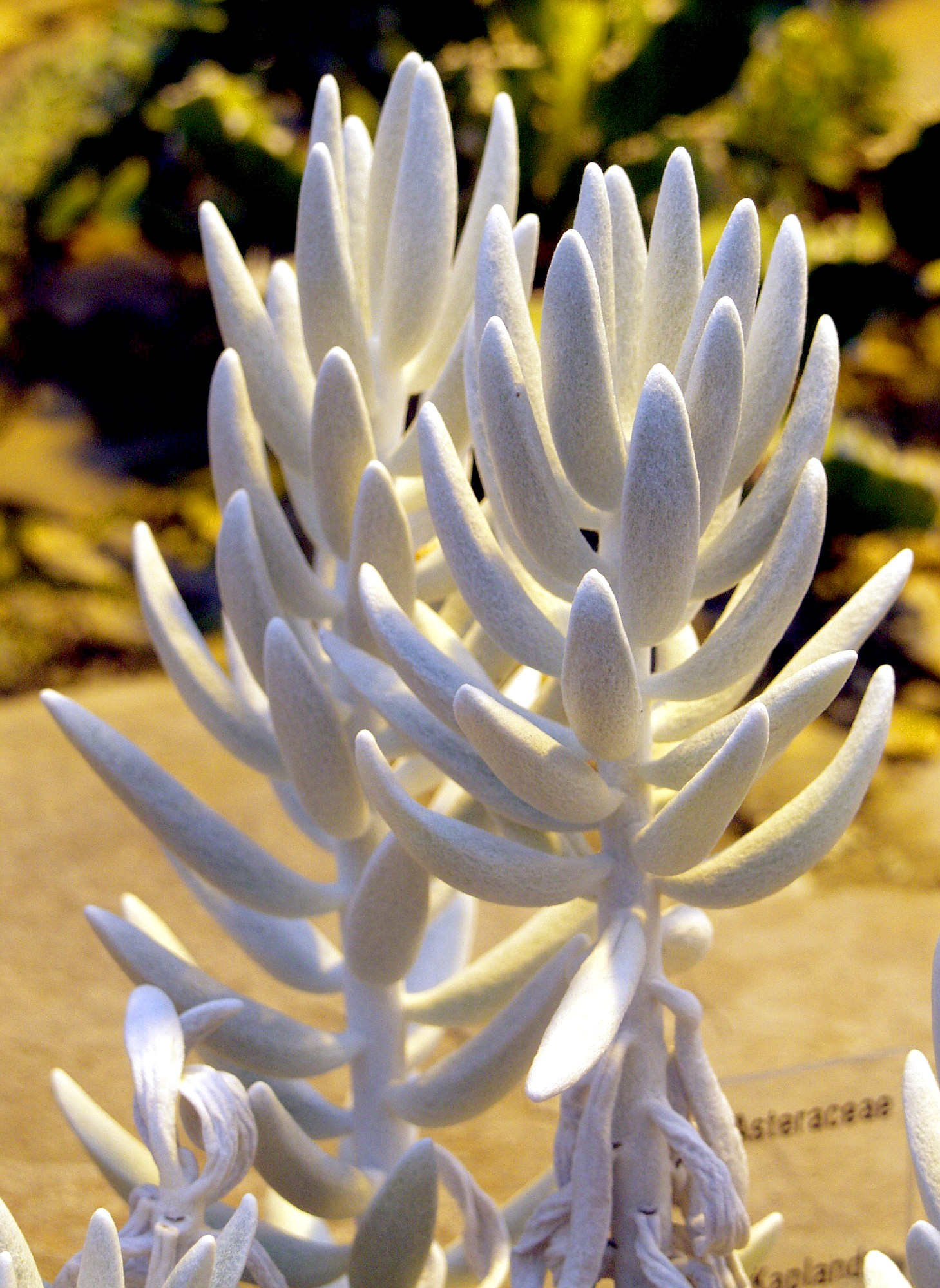
- Caputia tomentosa (formerly known as Senecio haworthii)

Scientific classification
- Kingdom: Plantae
- Clade: Tracheophytes
- Clade: Angiosperms
- Clade: Eudicots
- Clade: Asterids
- Order: Asterales
- Family: Asteraceae
- Subfamily: Asteroideae
- Tribe: Senecioneae
- Genus: Caputia; B.Nord. & Pelser

= Caputia =

Genus of flowering plants

Caputia is a small genus of flowering plants in the family Asteraceae, native to South Africa. It may be of hybrid origin. Species in this genus were formerly considered part of the genus Senecio.

== Species ==
Currently accepted species include:

- Caputia medley-woodii (Hutch.) B.Nord. & Pelser
- Caputia oribiensis (van Jaarsv.) J.C.Manning
- Caputia pyramidata (DC.) B.Nord. & Pelser
- Caputia scaposa (DC.) B.Nord. & Pelser
- Caputia tomentosa (Haw.) B.Nord. & Pelser
