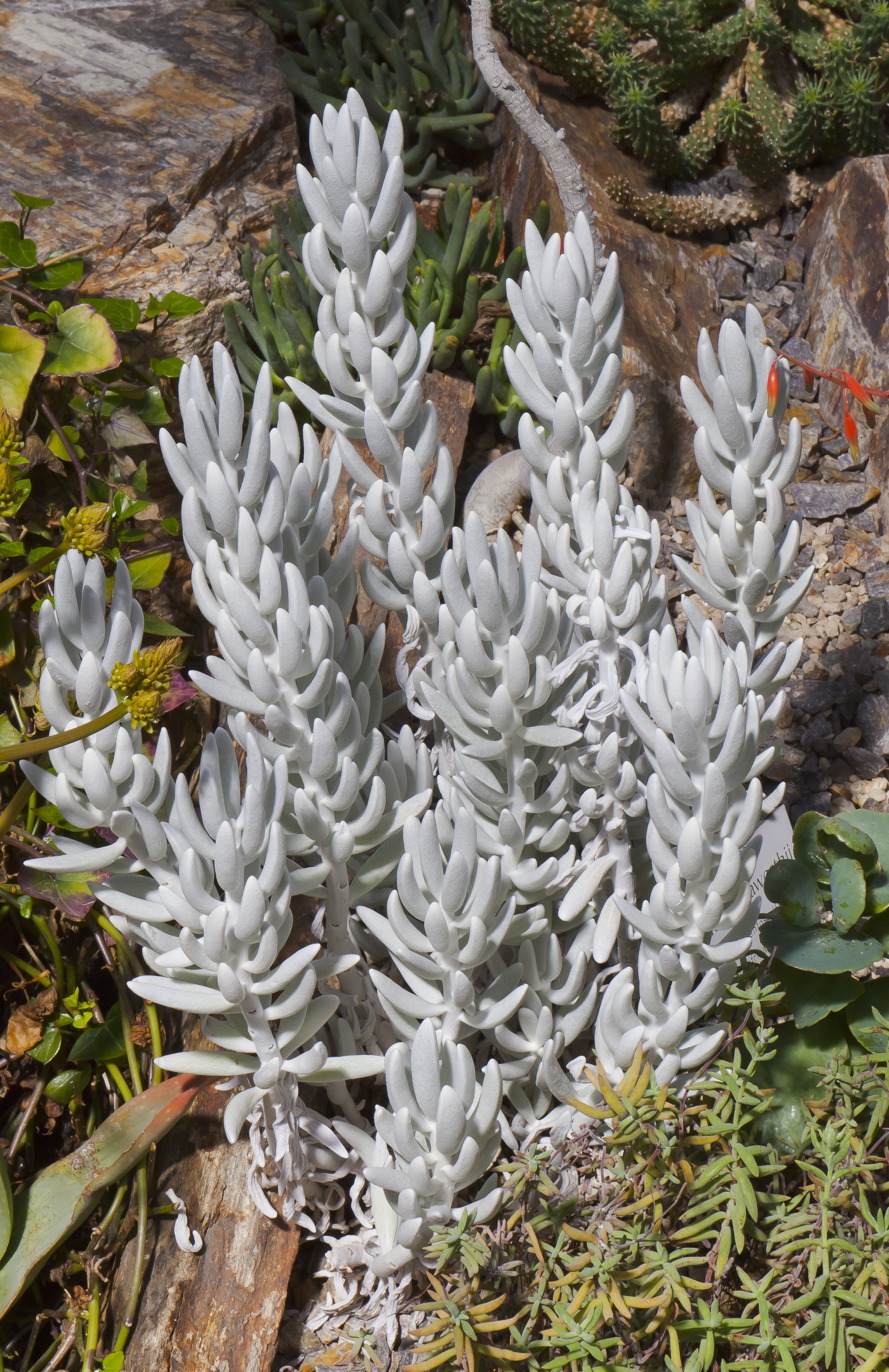
- woolly senecio

Scientific classification
- Kingdom: Plantae
- Clade: Tracheophytes
- Clade: Angiosperms
- Clade: Eudicots
- Clade: Asterids
- Order: Asterales
- Family: Asteraceae
- Genus: Caputia
- Species: C. tomentosa

Binomial name
- Caputia tomentosa (Haw.) B.Nord. & Pelser

Synonyms
- List: Cacalia haworthii Sweet; Cacalia tomentosa Haw.; Kleinia cana DC.; Kleinia haworthii DC.; Kleinia tomentosa Haw.; Notonia vestita Collett & Hemsl.; Senecio haworthii Sch.Bip.; Senecio haworthii Steud.; Senecio quinquangulatus Sch.Bip.; Senecio vestitus Sweet ex Steud.

= Caputia tomentosa =

Species of flowering plant

Caputia tomentosa, known as the woolly senecio, cocoon-plant, and the matted caputia, is a perennial, succulent dwarf shrub of the Caputia genus that grows in the Cape Provinces of South Africa, usually between the 900 and 1200 meters elevation. It has been introduced to Myanmar. It has gained the Royal Horticultural Society's Award of Garden Merit as an ornamental.

== History ==
Its first description was written by Adrian Hardy Haworth, in Miscellanea naturalia, 1803, p. 189, with the name of Cacalia tomentosa. Haworth stated that he had received the plant, introduced eight years before, from the Stockwell Botanical Garden of his friend Benjamin Robertson.

== Description ==
Growing up to 10–25 cm high, its leaves are densely felted, so much so that the felt can be stripped off, dried, and used as tinder. The plant is accordingly called "tontelbos" in Afrikaans. The word means "tinder bush". A plucked stem or leaf can be stuck into warm, not-too-dry earth, where it will root without special attention. Like most Richtersveld plants it does not do well in wet soil.

== Gallery ==
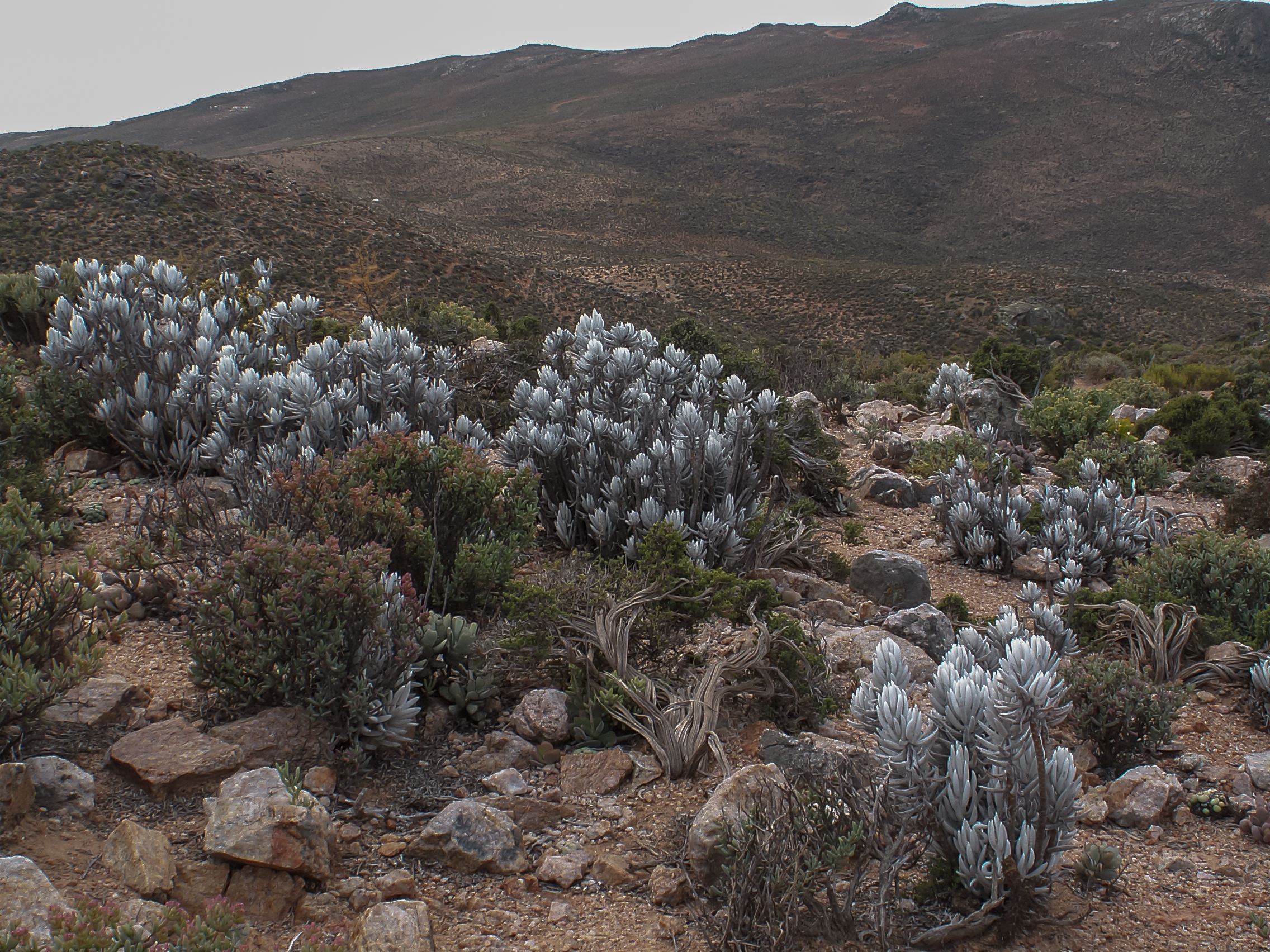
In its habitat, Richtersveld, South Africa

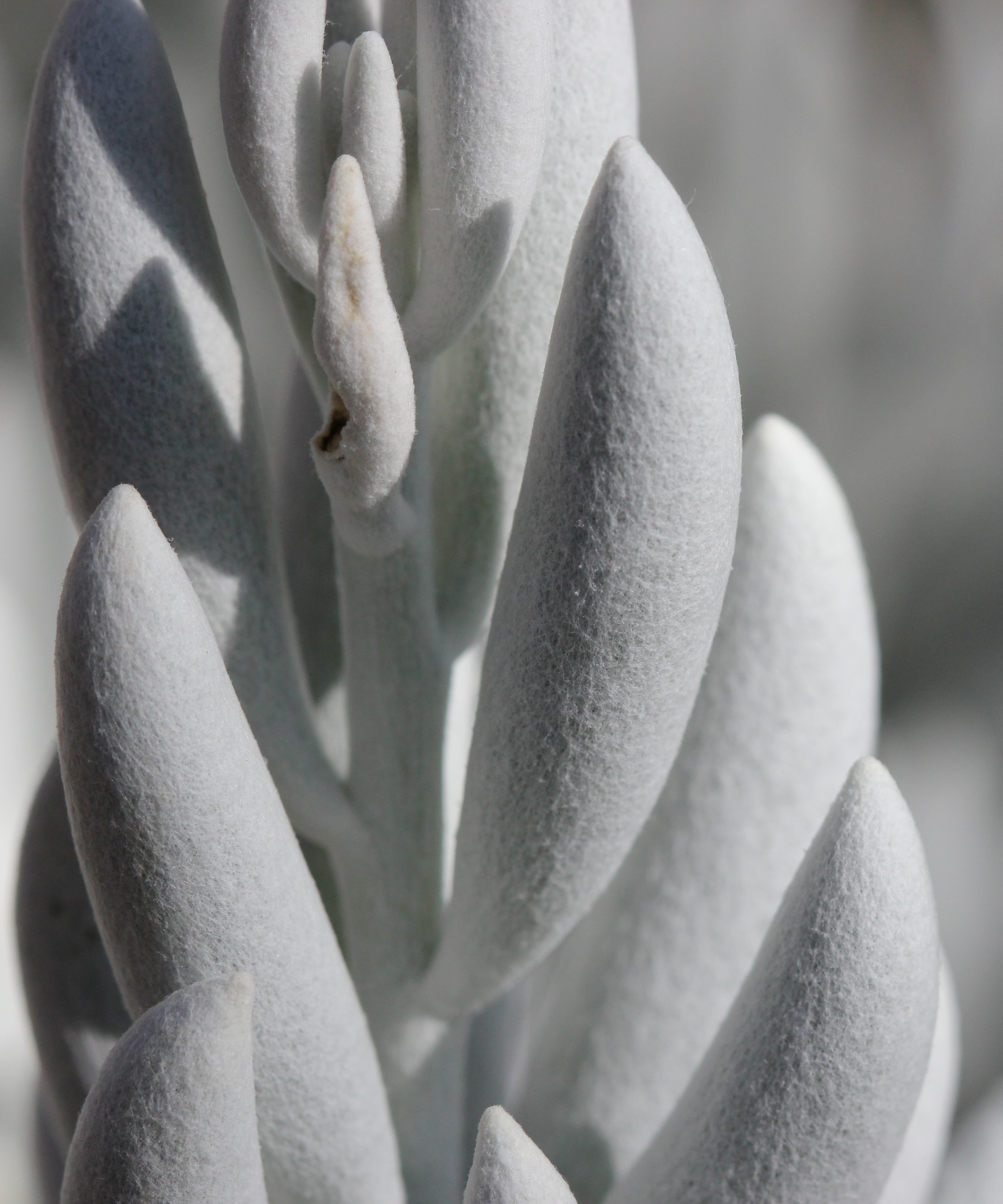
Leaves, showing dense, tight, felted surface

== Culture ==
Like in nature, Caputia tomentosa needs well-drained sandy loams, rare water and full sun.
