= Staufferia =

Scientific classification
- Kingdom: Plantae
- Clade: Tracheophytes
- Clade: Angiosperms
- Clade: Eudicots
- Order: Santalales
- Family: Santalaceae
- Genus: Staufferia; Z.S.Rogers, Nickrent & Malécot
- Species: S. capuronii

Binomial name
- Staufferia capuronii Z.S.Rogers, Nickrent & Malécot

Species of flowering plant

Staufferia is a monotypic genus of flowering plants belonging to the family Santalaceae. It just contains one species, Staufferia capuronii.

It is native to Madagascar.

The genus name of Staufferia is in honour of Hans Ulrich Stauffer (1929–1965), a Swiss botanist who traveled in South Africa, Australia and New Guinea; specialist in Santalaceae. The Latin specific epithet of capuronii is in honor of the French botanist René Capuron. Both the genus and the species were first described and published in Ann. Missouri Bot. Gard. Vol.95 on pages 394-395 in 2008.
