= Phoradendron nickrentianum =

Scientific classification
- Kingdom: Plantae
- Clade: Tracheophytes
- Clade: Angiosperms
- Clade: Eudicots
- Order: Santalales
- Family: Santalaceae
- Genus: Phoradendron
- Species: P. nickrentianum

Binomial name
- Phoradendron nickrentianum Kuijt

Species of flowering plant

Phoradendron nickrentianum is a hemiparasitic plant in the Santalaceae (previously Viscaceae) family, native to Peru. There are no synonyms.

== Description ==
P. nickrentianum is a dioecious plant, with pinnately veined leaf-blades (14 cm by 4.5 cm) on a petiole which is about 1 cm long. The male inflorescence (on a 2 cm peduncle) is up to 4.5 cm long with up to 9 fertile internodes. No pistillate plants were seen by Kuijt.

It is very like Phoradendron undulatum, but differs significantly in being dioecious.

== Taxonomy ==
P. nickrentianum was first described in 2011 by Job Kuijt, who gave it the specific epithet, nickrentianum, to honour Daniel Nickrent, who "has brought the knowledge of parasitic angiosperms to unprecedented heights".
