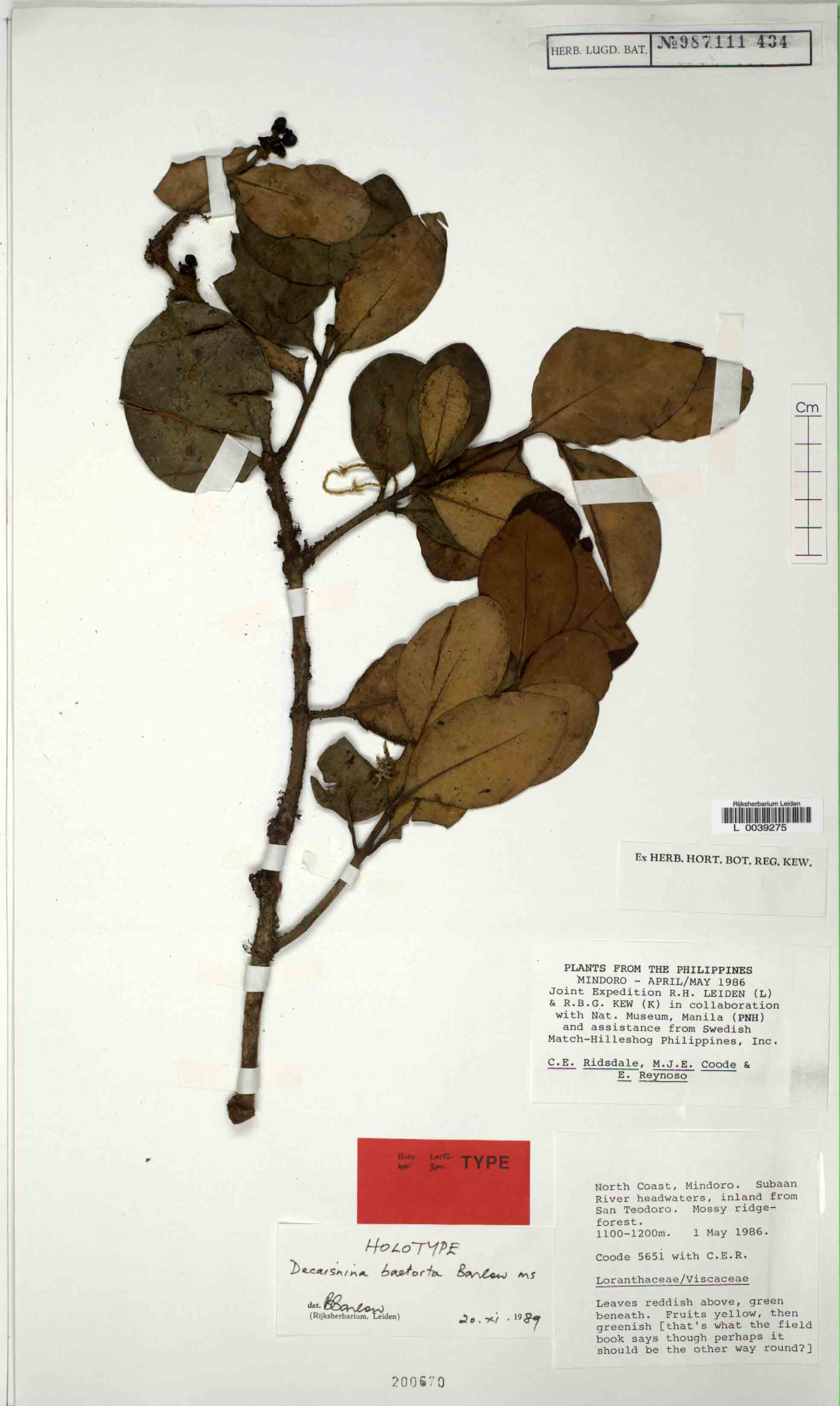
- Cyne baetorta holotype herbarium specimen

Scientific classification
- Kingdom: Plantae
- Clade: Tracheophytes
- Clade: Angiosperms
- Clade: Eudicots
- Order: Santalales
- Family: Loranthaceae
- Genus: Cyne; Danser

Synonyms
- Tetradyas Danser

= Cyne (plant) =

Genus of flowering plants

Cyne is a genus of flowering plants belonging to the family Loranthaceae. A revised description of the genus was given in 2022 by Daniel Nickrent and Mark Rule.

It is native to the Philippines, the Maluku Islands and New Guinea. They are found at elevations ranging from sea level to subalpine.

== Description ==
They are parasitic plants with epicortical roots (on top of the bark) and secondary haustoria (a structure developed for penetrating the host plant's tissues). The leaves are decussate (opposite with successive pairs borne at right angles to the last) and the venation is pinnate. It has flowers which are a much contracted raceme of 1 or more decussate pairs of triads (groups of three). They are rarely dyads (groups of 2), developing below and breaking through a shell of cork, raising a rupturing blister or calyptra as the flowers expand. The triads and flowers have minute peduncles (flower stalks) and pedicels, each flower has a bract (modified leaf), those of each triad forming an involucre (flower and leaf structure). It has 6 or more petals, which are more or less choripetalous (having separate petals). The anthers are basifixed, and sessile (attached without a stalk). The style is often basally articulate and the stigma is usually capitate (looking like the head of a pin). The fruit (or seed capsule) is ellipsoid (in shape), with a persistent stylar base.

== Known species ==
As accepted by Kew:

- Cyne baetorta Barlow
- Cyne banahaensis (Elmer) Danser
- Cyne monotrias Barlow
- Cyne papuana (Danser) Barlow
- Cyne perfoliata (Danser) Barlow
- Cyne quadriangula Danser

The type species is Cyne banahaensis.

== Taxonomy ==
The genus name of Cyne is of Old English origin and means "royal". It was first described and published in Bull. Jard. Bot. Buitenzorg, séries 3, Vol.10 on page 306 in 1929.

The genus is recognized by the United States Department of Agriculture and the Agricultural Research Service, but they do not list any known species.

== Other sources ==
- Barlow, B.A. (1993) Conspectus of the Genera Amylotheca, Cyne, Decaisnina, Lampas, Lepeostegeres, and Loxanthera (Loranthaceae). Blumea 38: 65–126.
