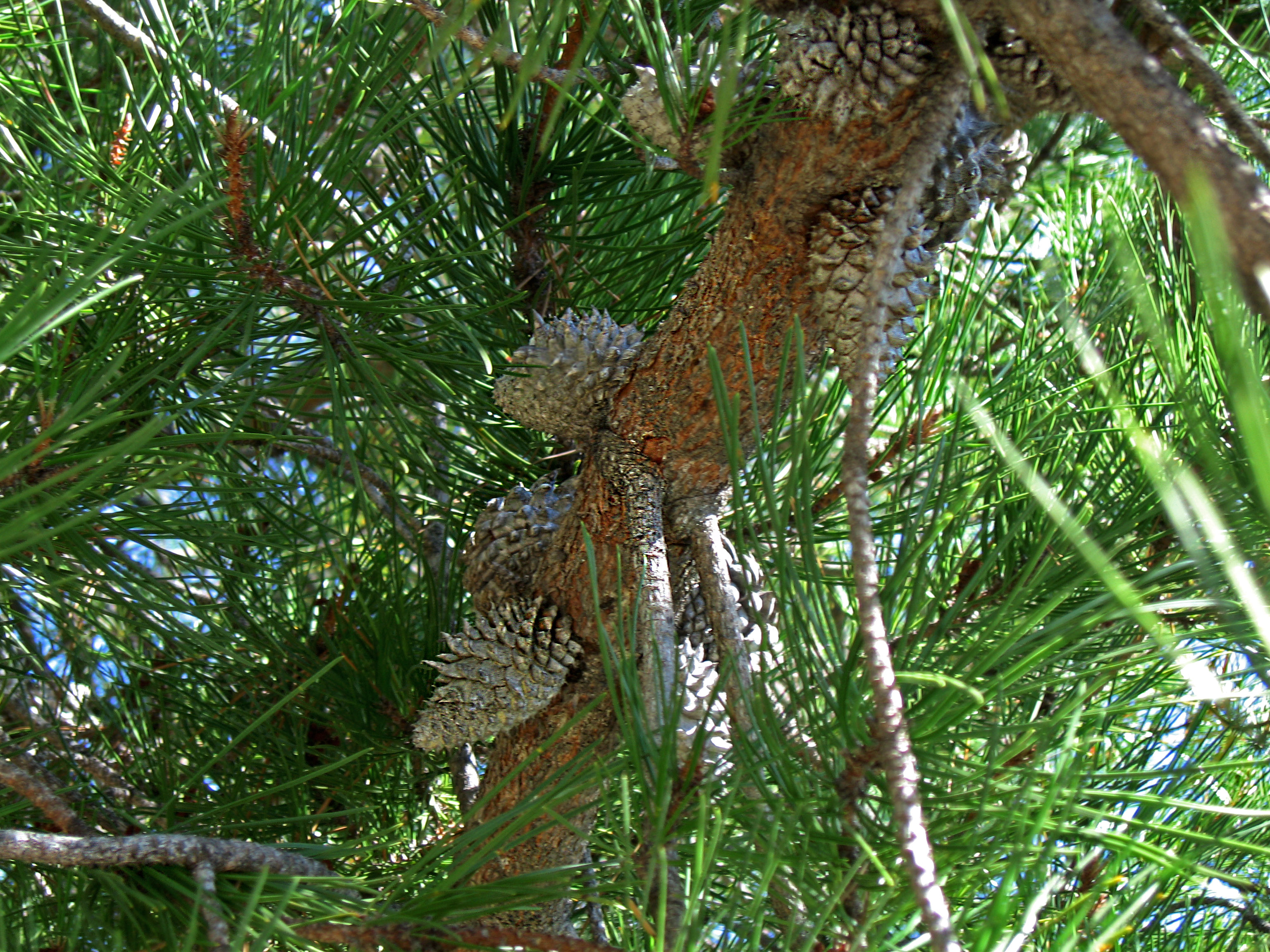

Conservation status
- Vulnerable (IUCN 3.1)

Scientific classification
- Kingdom: Plantae
- Clade: Tracheophytes
- Clade: Gymnosperms
- Division: Pinophyta
- Class: Pinopsida
- Order: Pinales
- Family: Pinaceae
- Genus: Pinus
- Subgenus: P. subg. Pinus
- Section: P. sect. Trifoliae
- Subsection: P. subsect. Australes
- Species: P. muricata

Binomial name
- Pinus muricata D.Don
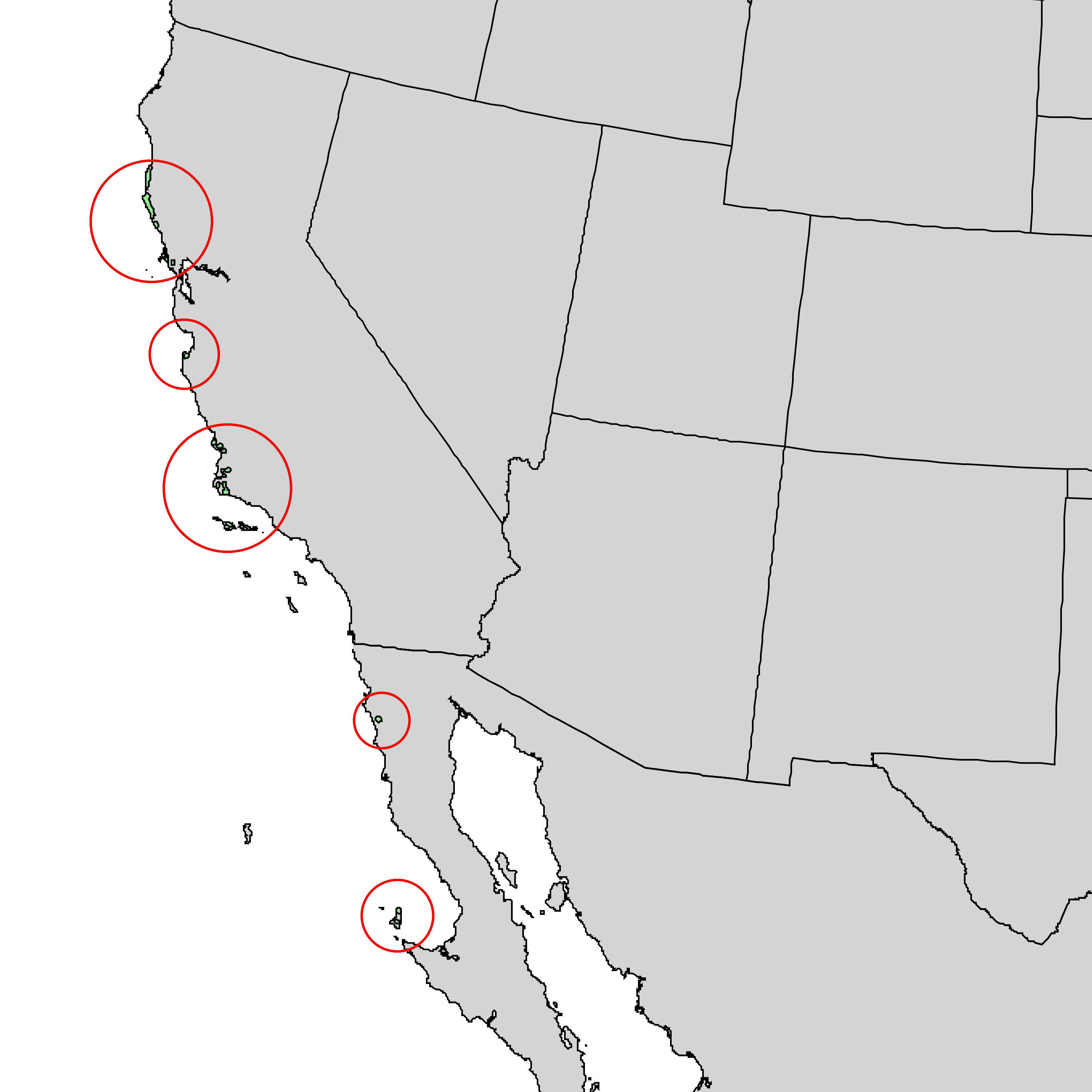
- Natural range of Pinus muricata

= Pinus muricata =

Species of conifer

Pinus muricata, the bishop pine, is a species of conifer in the family Pinaceae, a pine with a very restricted range: mostly in California, including several offshore Channel Islands, and a few locations in Baja California, Mexico. Stands of Bishop Pine are also found in Point Reyes National Seashore, in Marin County north of San Francisco, always on the west side of the San Andreas Fault that runs through the park. It is always on or near the coast.

In San Luis Obispo County it is found alone or in stands scattered on the coastal mountains and hills from Morro Bay to Shell Beach. A few stands of the tree are seen on the hills above the Sycamore Canyon Resort in Avila Beach. Bishop pine seems to prefer already disturbed, unvegetated areas where it probably faces less competition from oaks and shrubs.

The common name "bishop pine" resulted from the tree having been first identified near the Mission of San Luis Obispo in San Luis Obispo, California. This tree has a large number of common names and other prior scientific names, due primarily to numerous variant forms. Other English names that have occasionally been used are prickle cone pine, Obispo pine, Santa Cruz pine and dwarf marine pine.

== Description ==
Pinus muricata is a coniferous tree growing to a height of 15 to 26 metres (49 to 85 ft), rarely up to 34 metres (112 ft), with a trunk diameter of up to 1.2 metres (3.9 ft). The species is often smaller, stunted and twisted in coastal exposures. It is drought-tolerant and grows on dry, rocky soil.

The needles are in pairs, green to blue-green, and 8–16 cm (3–6.5 in) long. Cones occur in one to five clusters. The cones are strongly reflexed down the branch, 5-to-10-centimetre-long (2.0 to 3.9 in) long; the scales are stiff, thin on the side of the cone facing the stem, but greatly thickened on the side facing away and with a stout 5 to 12 millimetres (0.20 to 0.47 in) spine; both features adaptive to minimise squirrel predation and fire damage to the cones. The cones remain unopened for many years until fire or strong heat causes them to open and release the seeds.

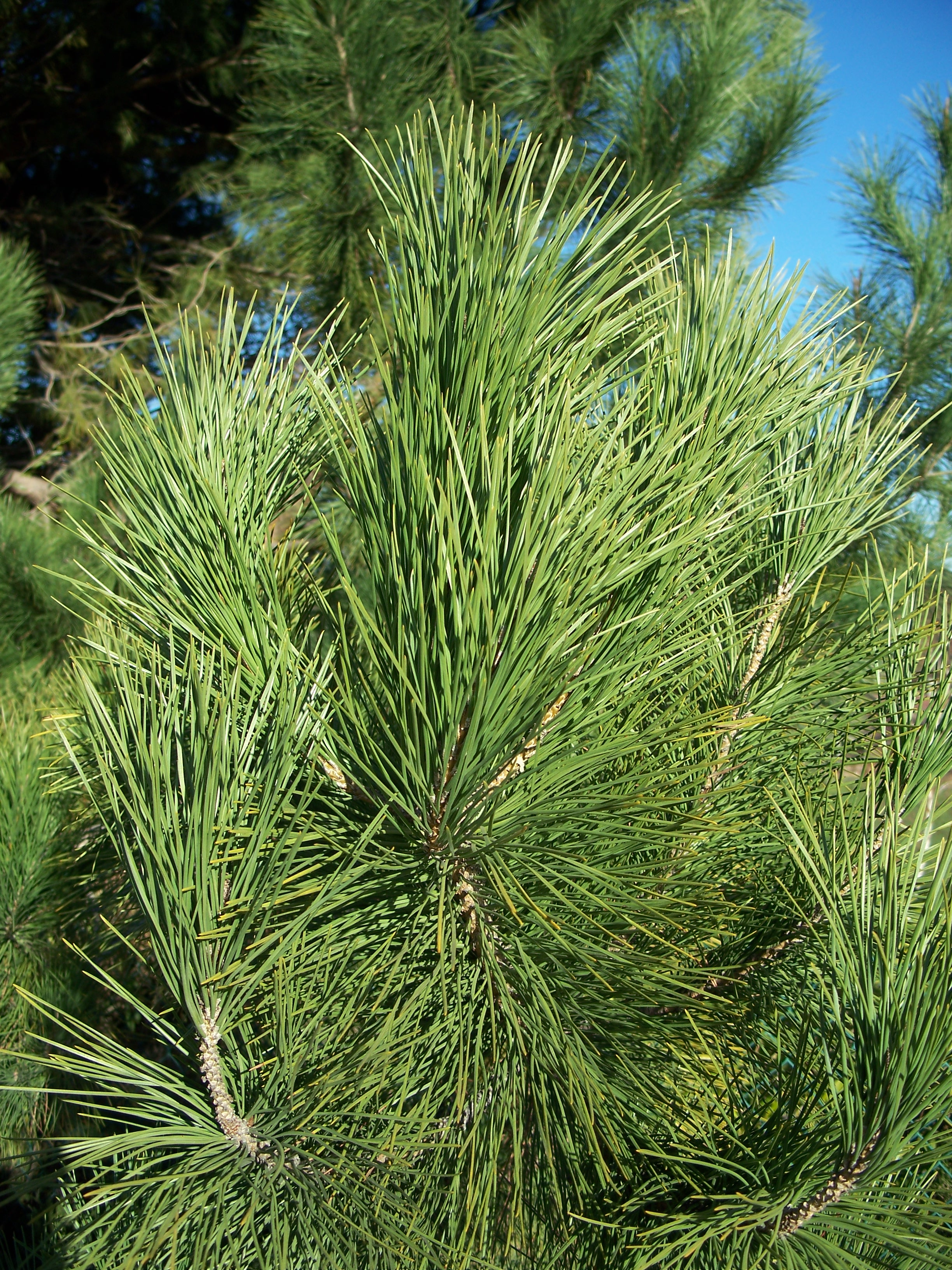
Needles

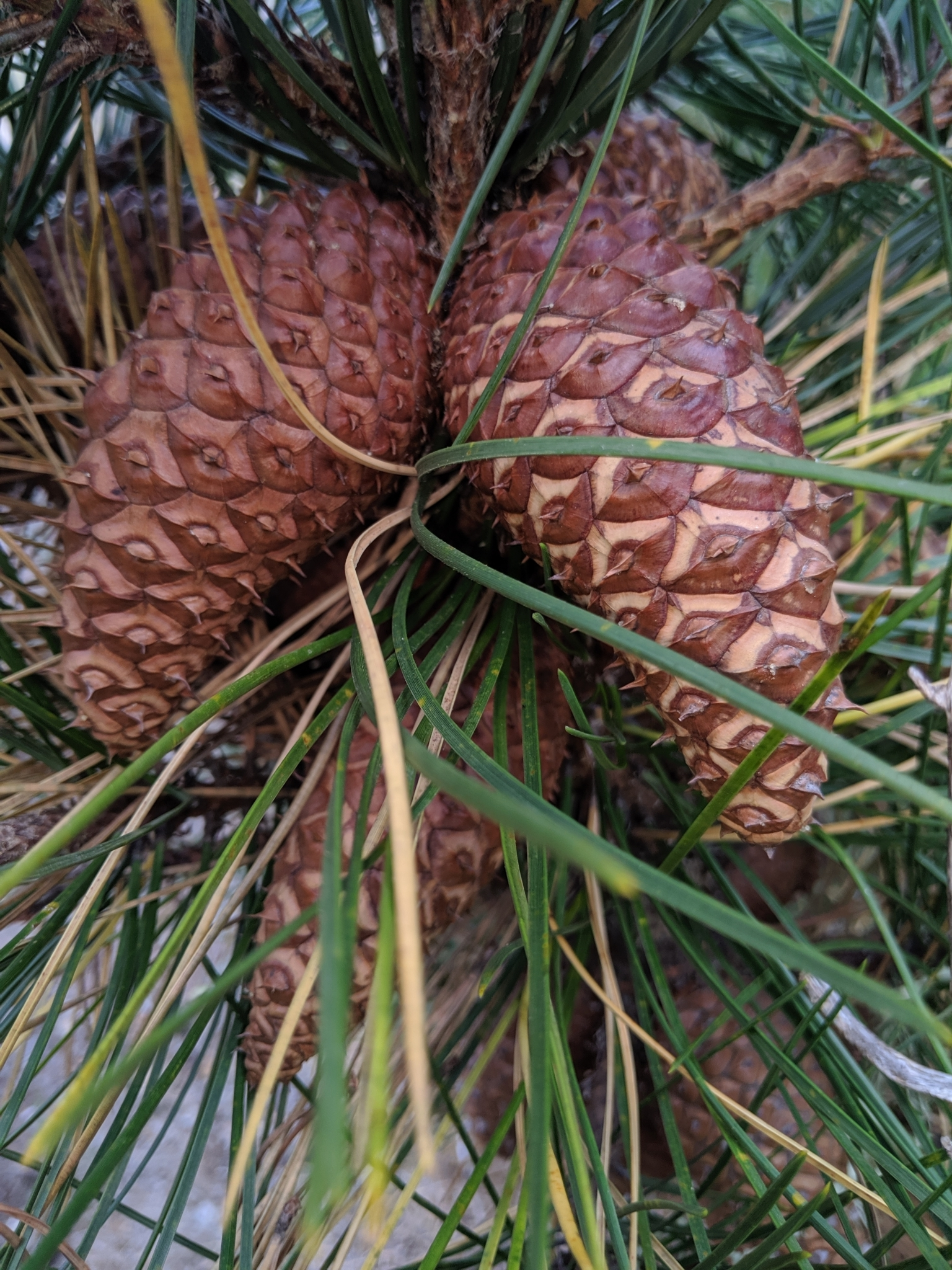
Cones

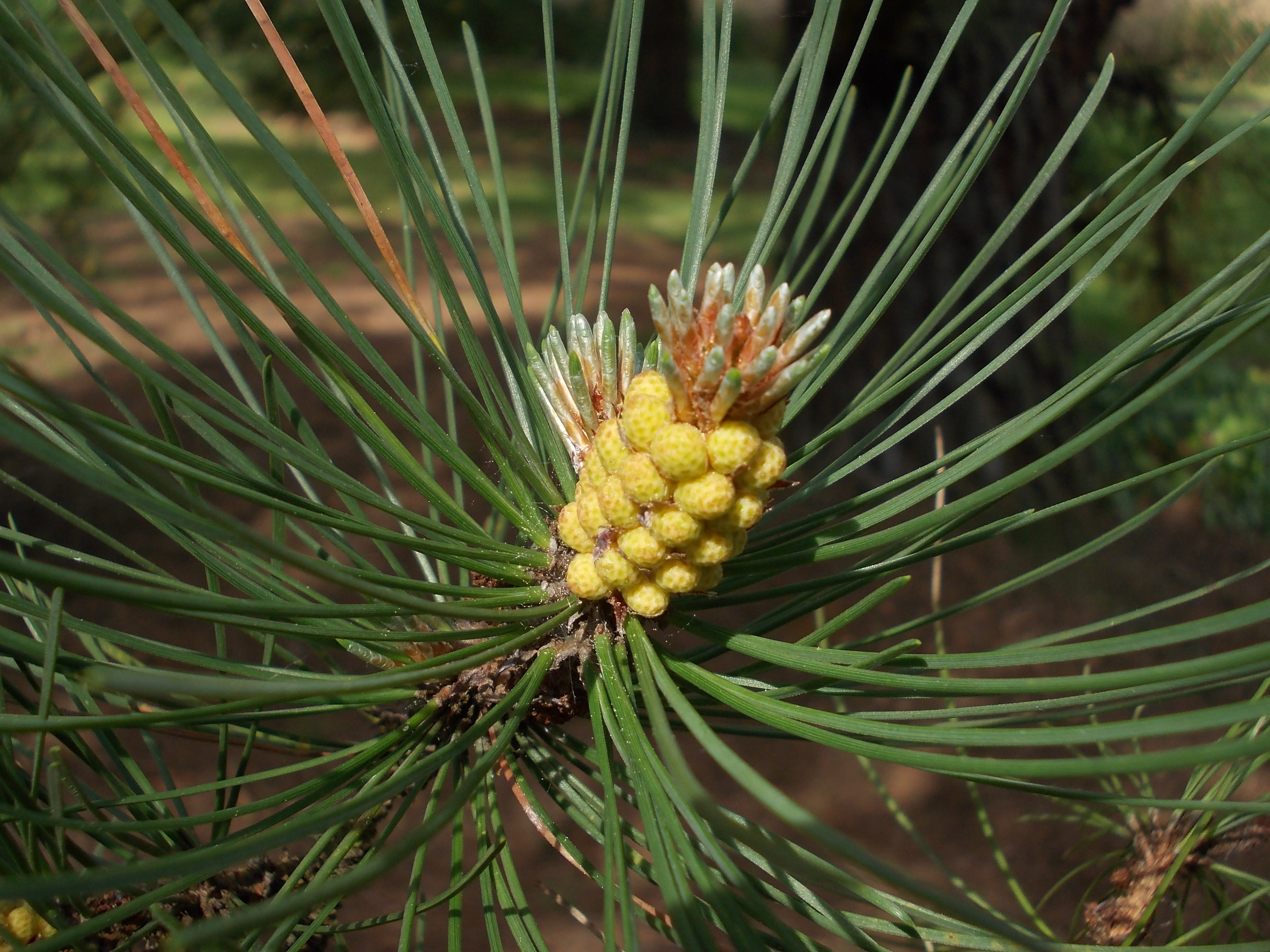
Growing tips

== Forms ==
There are two Pinus muricata forms:

- a southern form with bright green needles
- a northern form with dark blue-green needles.

The resin composition also differs. The dividing line between the two is very sharp, five miles (8 km) south of the boundary between Mendocino County and Sonoma County, California. Experimental attempts to hybridize the two forms have consistently failed, indicating that their taxonomic relationship may be more distant than the very small differences in appearance would suggest.

== Ecology ==
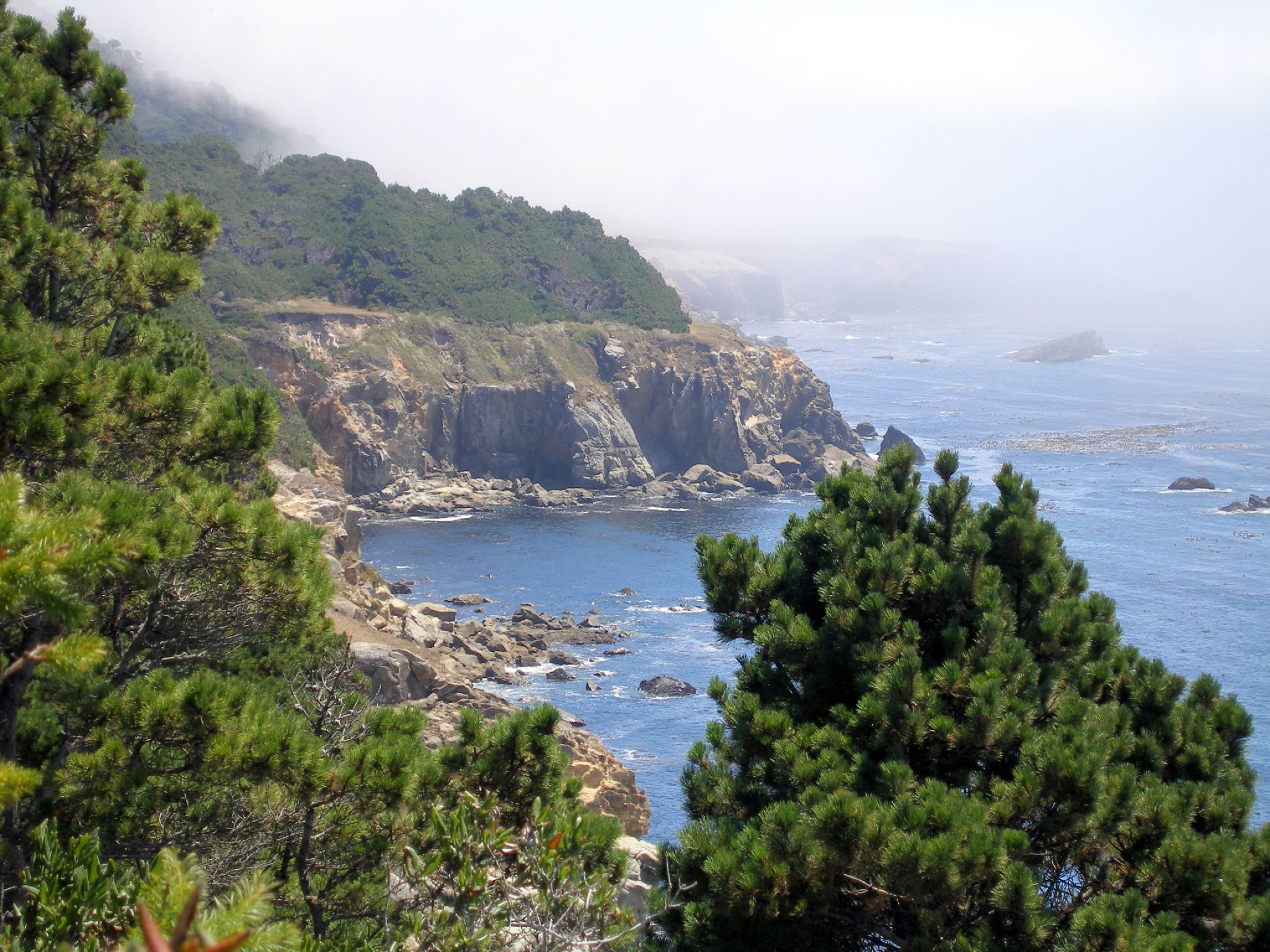
Growing in Salt Point, California

Pinus muricata benefits from the cool and moist air created by fog. Shortening fog range has caused the range of P. muricata proliferation to gradually move northward from its original range in Southern California over thousands of years.

P. muricata is found with several oak and cypress associates within the California Coast Ranges. There are also a number of common understory flora associates including sword fern, salal and western poison oak. Notable occurrences of P. muricata is in association with Mendocino cypress as a pygmy forest on coastal terraces in Mendocino County and Sonoma County, including one location within Salt Point State Park. It is classified an endangered species in Mexico.

Along with Pinus radiata, P. muricata is one of the principal hosts of the dwarf mistletoe species Arceuthobium littorum. Infection by A. littorum negatively affects the vigor, longevity, and reproductive rate of the host tree and often induces the production of large, abnormal growths called witch's brooms.

== Uses ==
Pinus muricata has been used in plantations with resultant growth rates higher than in the wild, but with adverse impacts to biodiversity.

This plant has ornamental value, and is cultivated in parks and gardens. It has gained the Royal Horticultural Society's Award of Garden Merit.
