= Romina Vidal-Russell =

Argentinean botanist

Romina Vidal Russell
- Scientific career
- Fields: Botany
- Workplaces: National University of Comahue, Argentina
- Author abbrev. (botany): Vidal-Russ., Vid.-Russ.

Romina Vidal-Russell is an Argentinean botanist who works in the areas of phytogeography, phylogeny, and parasitic plants, and on which she has written extensively. Her papers on the phylogeny of parasitic plants are cited on the APG website, and elsewhere and her collaborations are international. She currently works at the National University of Comahue in Argentina. She earned a Ph.D. at SIUC with Daniel L. Nickrent as supervisor.

(She has two botanist abbreviations in IPNI: one as a botanist, the other as a mycologist.)

The standard author abbreviation Vidal-Russ. is used to indicate this person as the author when citing a botanical name.

The standard author abbreviation Vid.-Russ. is used to indicate this person as the author when citing a botanical name.

== Names published ==
- Amyeminae Nickrent & Vidal-Russ., Taxon 59(2): 548 (2010).
- Dendrophthoinae Nickrent & Vidal-Russ., Taxon 59(2): 549 (2010).
- Emelianthinae Nickrent & Vidal-Russ., Taxon 59(2): 549 (-550) (2010).
- Ileostylinae Nickrent & Vidal-Russ., Taxon 59(2): 548 (2010).
- Ligarinae Nickrent & Vidal-Russ., Taxon 59(2): 547 (2010).

(incomplete list as Vidal-Russ.)

- Chaenothecopsis quintralis Messuti, Amico, Lorenzo & Vid.-Russ. 2012

(as Vid.-Russ. - mycology)
