= Daniel Lee Nickrent =

American botanist (born 1956)

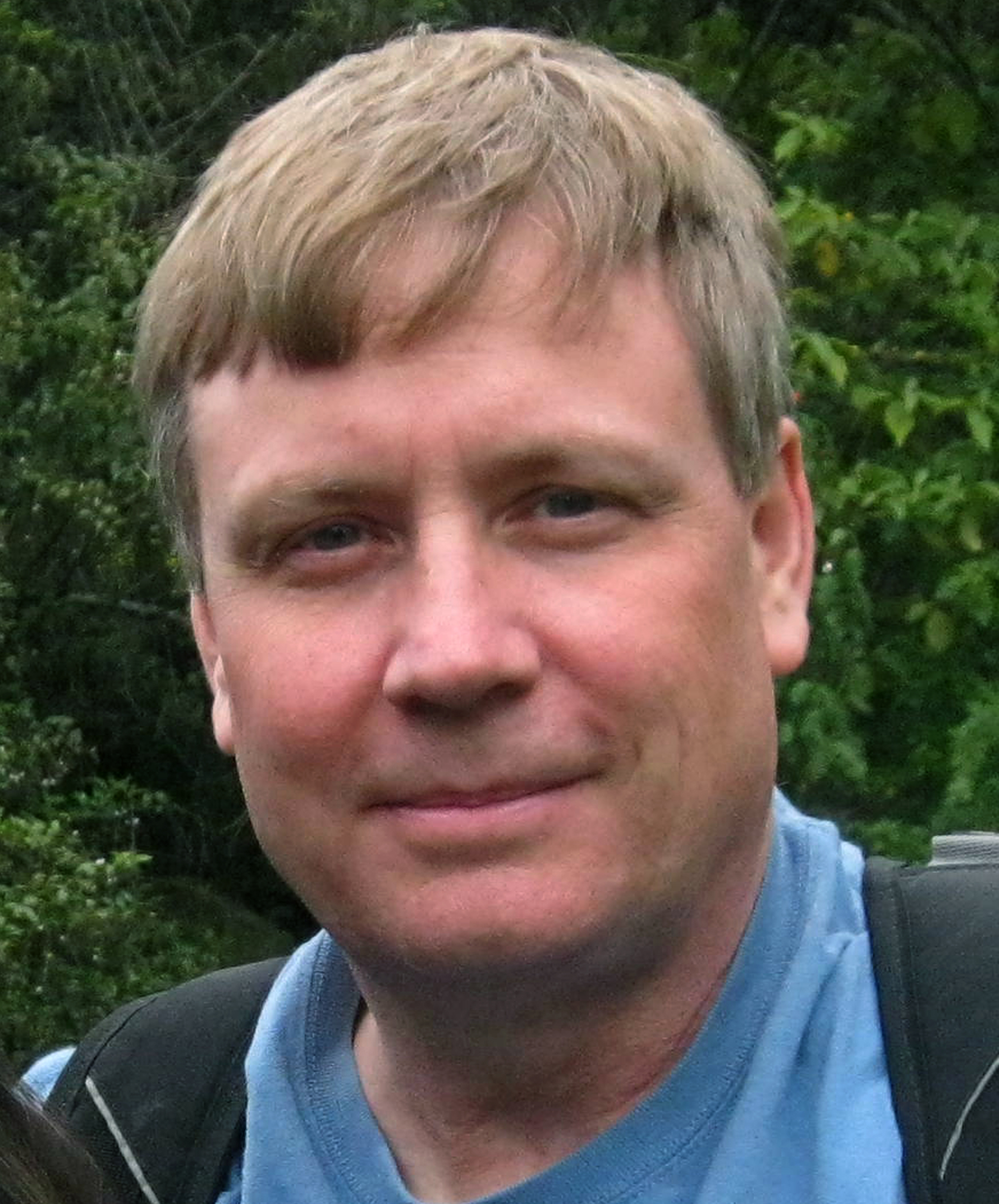
- Born: 20 February 1956 (age 70); Bloomington, Illinois
- Citizenship: United States of America
- Education: Southern Illinois University; Old Dominion University (M.S.); Miami University (PhD)
- Known for: Plant Molecular Systematics and Evolution; Parasitic plants; Botany of the Philippines
- Scientific career
- Workplaces: Old Dominion University; University of Illinois; Illinois Natural History Survey; Southern Illinois University
- Thesis: A systematic and evolutionary study of selected taxa in the genus Arceuthobium (Viscaceae) (1984)
- Doctoral advisor: W. Hardy Eshbaugh; Sheldon Guttman
- Doctoral students: Romina Vidal-Russell
- Author abbrev. (botany): Nickrent
- Website: nickrentlab.siu.edu cals.cornell.edu/daniel-nickrent

Daniel Lee Nickrent (born 1956) is an American botanist, working in plant evolutionary biology, including the subdisciplines of genomics, phylogenetics, systematics, population genetics, and taxonomy. A major focus has been parasitic flowering plants, particularly of the sandalwood order (Santalales). His interest in photographic documentation and photographic databases has led to several photographic databases including Parasitic Plant Connection, Phytoimages, Plant Checklist for the Rocky Mountain National Park, Plant Checklist for the Crab Orchard National Wildlife Refuge, Co's Digital Flora of the Philippines

Nickrent has over 26000 citations (as of 25 April 2026) according to Google Scholar. He is Research Faculty and Professor Emeritus of Plant Molecular Systematics and Evolution at Southern Illinois University Carbondale (SIUC) (As of July 2019).

The standard author abbreviation Nickrent is used to indicate this person as the author when citing a botanical name.

== Education ==
After completing one year towards his undergraduate degree at Illinois State University, Nickrent's interest in plants began during his participation in an NSF-sponsored research project where he worked on the flora of the Great Dismal Swamp under the direction of Lytton Musselman at Old Dominion University. This work resulted in his first publication. In 1977 he received a bachelor's degree in Botany from Southern Illinois University. He earned a master's degree from Old Dominion University with work on the parasite witchweed Striga, and earned a PhD from Miami University in 1984 ("A systematic and evolutionary study of selected taxa in the genus Arceuthobium (Viscaceae)").

== Career ==
From 1984 to 1990, Nickrent was assistant professor and Director of the University of Illinois Herbarium (ILL) at the University of Illinois at Urbana–Champaign.

From 1990 to 1994, Nickrent was assistant professor in the faculty of Plant Biology, Southern Illinois University Carbondale. During this period, his laboratory methodology changed from working with rRNA to DNA using the polymerase chain reaction (PCR) which made sequencing genes easier. This resulted in the discovery of increased rates of gene evolution in parasitic plants and the publication of one of the earliest species-level molecular phylogenies using nuclear ITS on the dwarf mistletoes, Arceuthobium.

From 1994 to 2003, as an associate professor in the Department of Plant Biology, Southern Illinois University Carbondale, Nickrent's research program expanded to examine many groups of parasitic plants, including those that lack photosynthesis (holoparasites). In 2004, he again collaborated with Musselman to produce an article on parasitic plants hosted by the American Phytopathological Society.

From 2003 to 2014, Nickrent was a full professor at the university, becoming an emeritus professor (SIUC) from 2014 onwards. His work on Rafflesia in the Philippines was supported by a grant from the National Geographic Society in 2008, the start of a continuing collaboration with Julie Barcelona and Pieter Pelser. His work in the Philippines, funded by NSF-DEB in 2018, is a collaborative project with Botanical Research Institute of Texas and other national and international institutions. Other grants have also been awarded to Nickrent as principal investigator to allow continuing work on other aspects of Santalales and parasitic plants.

Since 1986, Nickrent has served as an associate professional scientist with the Illinois Natural History Survey.

He has been an adjunct professor at Cornell since 2021, and has served as a research associate for the Fort Worth Botanical Garden since 2020, and as research associate for the Missouri Botanical Garden from 2011 to 2025.

The Angiosperm Phylogeny Website (Santalales) notes that in 2008, Der & Nickrent found Santalaceae to be polyphyletic with some genera being outside the family, but eight well supported clades within. While in 2019, Nickrent and others further improved resolution within the family, using nuclear and chloroplast genes, while trying to understand its complex morphology.

in 2023, with Nickrent's advent to Cornell, the Cornell Herbarium site CUBIC (Cornell University Botanical Image Collection), a cooperative database of plant images, was created by combining the sites Plantsystematics.org, and Phytoimages.

== Honors ==
=== Eponymous species ===
- Amyema nickrentii Barcelona & Pelser – 2013, Phytotaxa 125(1) 47.
- Phoradendron nickrentianum Kuijt – 2011, Novon 21(4) 456.

== Taxa named ==
Nickrent has authored some 50 taxa, including:

- Thesium nautimontanum M.A.García, Nickrent & Mucina, PhytoKeys 109: 44 (2018).
- Lepeostegeres cebuensis Barcelona, Nickrent & Pelser, Phytotaxa 266(1): 48 (2016).
- Lacomucinaea lineata (L.f.) Nickrent & M.A.García, Phytotaxa 224(2): 180 (2015).
- Arceuthobium littorum Hawksw., Wiens & Nickrent, Novon 2: 206 (1992).
- Rafflesia verrucosa Balete, Pelser, Nickrent & Barcelona, Phytotaxa 10: 50 (49–55; figs. 2A-F, 3A-F) (2010).
- Staufferia Z.S.Rogers, Nickrent & Malécot, Ann. Missouri Bot. Gard. 95(2): 394–395) (2008).
- Pilgerina Z.S.Rogers, Nickrent & Malécot, Ann. Missouri Bot. Gard. 95(2): 398–399) (2008).
- Cervantesiaceae Nickrent & Der, Taxon 59(2): 551 (2010).
- Nanodeaceae Nickrent & Der, Taxon 59(2): 552 (2010).

== Selected publications ==
- Woorin Kim; Jost, Matthias; Nickrent, Daniel Lee; Renchao Zhou; Pelin Acar; Felix Langschied; Ebersberger, Ingo; Wicke, Susann; Wanke, Stefan (2026). "Progress and prospects of parasitic plant biodiversity genomics" (PDF). Plant and Cell Physiology. doi:10.1093/pcp/pcag009. Wikidata Q139568510.
- Runxian Yu; Jost, Matthias; Wanke, Stefan; David Bruy; Li, Pan; Nickrent, Daniel Lee; Renchao Zhou (2025). "Evidence for plastome loss in the holoparasitic Mystropetalaceae". New Phytologist. 249 (2): 647–655. doi:10.1111/nph.70709. Wikidata Q139568496.
- Anderson, Benjamin Michael; Edlund, Maja; James, Shelley Anne; Brendan J. Lepschi; Nickrent, Daniel Lee; Sultan, Amir; Tate, Jennifer Alane; Petersen, Gitte (2025). "Evolutionary relationships in Santalales inferred using target capture with Angiosperms353, focusing on Australasian Santalaceae sensu lato". Australian Systematic Botany. 38 (4). doi:10.1071/sb24026. Wikidata Q135408435.
- Maja Edlund; Anderson, Benjamin Michael; Huei-Jiun Su; Tanner Robison; Marcos A Caraballo-Ortiz; Joshua P Der; Nickrent, Daniel Lee; Petersen, Gitte (2024). "Plastome evolution in Santalales involves relaxed selection prior to loss of ndh genes and major boundary shifts of the inverted repeat". Annals of Botany. doi:10.1093/aob/mcae145. Wikidata Q135934664.
- Nickrent, D.L.; Anderson, F.; Kuijt, J. (2019). "Inflorescence evolution in Santalales: integrating morphological characters and molecular phylogenetics". American Journal of Botany. 106 (3): 402–414. doi:10.1002/ajb2.1250. ISSN 0002-9122. PMID 30856677. S2CID 75136911.
- García, M.A.; Nickrent, D.L.; Mucina, L. (2018). "Thesium nautimontanum, a new species of Thesiaceae (Santalales) from South Africa". PhytoKeys (109): 41–51. doi:10.3897/phytokeys.109.28607. ISSN 1314-2003. PMC 6177524. PMID 30305798..
- Amico G.C., Nickrent, D.L. & Vidal-Russell, R.. 2018. "Macroscale analysis of mistletoe host ranges in the Andean-Patagonian forest". Plant Biology pdf. doi:10.1111/plb.12900.
- Pelser, P.B.; Nickrent, D.L.; Barcelona, J.F. (2018). "A conservation genetic study of Rafflesia speciosa (Rafflesiaceae): patterns of genetic diversity and differentiation within and between islands". Blumea - Biodiversity, Evolution and Biogeography of Plants. 63 (2): 93–101. doi:10.3767/blumea.2018.63.02.01. hdl:10092/17923. ISSN 0006-5196.
- Liu, B.; Le, C.T.; Barrett, R.L.; Nickrent, D.L.; Chen, Z.; Lu, L.; Vidal-Russell, R. (2018). "Historical biogeography of Loranthaceae (Santalales): Diversification agrees with emergence of tropical forests and radiation of songbirds". Molecular Phylogenetics and Evolution. 124: 199–212. doi:10.1016/j.ympev.2018.03.010. hdl:11336/90592. ISSN 1055-7903. PMID 29550535. S2CID 4855752.
- Nickrent, D.L. (2017). "Status of the Genera Colpoon, Osyris and Rhoiacarpos in South Africa". Bothalia. 47 (1). doi:10.4102/abc.v47i1.2260. ISSN 2311-9284.
- Pelser, Pieter B.; Nickrent, D.L.; Gemmill, C.E.C.; Barcelona, J.F. (2017). "Genetic Diversity and Structure in the Philippine Rafflesia lagascae Complex (Rafflesiaceae) inform its Taxonomic Delimitation and Conservation". Systematic Botany. 42 (3): 543–553. doi:10.1600/036364417X696186. hdl:10092/15160. ISSN 0363-6445. S2CID 56307991.
- Pyšek, P., Pergl, J., Essl, F., Lenzner, B., Dawson, W., Kreft, H., Weigelt, P., Winter, M., Kartesz, J., Nishino, M., Antonova, L. A., Baptiste, M. P., Barcelona, J. F., Cabezas, F. J., Cárdenas, D., Cárdenas-Toro, J., Castaño, N., Chacón, E., Chatelain, C., Dullinger, S., Ebel, A. L., Figueiredo, E., Fuentes, N., Genovesi, P., Groom, Q. J., Henderson, L., Inderjit, Kupriyanov, A., Masciadri, S., Maurel, N., Meerman, J., Morozova, O., Moser, D., Nickrent, D., Nowak, P. M., Pagad, S., Patzelt, A., Pelser, P. B., Seebens, H., Shu, W.-S., Thomas, J., Velayos, M., Weber, E., Wieringa, J. J., Kleunen, M. v. 2017. Naturalized and invasive alien flora of the world: species diversity, taxonomic and phylogenetic patterns, geographic distribution and global hotspots of plant invasion. Preslia 89: 203–274.
- Nickrent, D. L. & L. J. Musselman. (2017) Parasitic plants. Chapter 17, pp. 277–288 in Plant Pathology: Concepts and Laboratory Exercises, 3rd. Ed., Ownley, B. H. and R. N. Trigiano (eds.). CRC Press, Boca Raton.
- Nickrent, D. L. 2016. Ximeniaceae, Schoepfiaceae, Comandraceae, Thesiaceae, Cervantesiaceae, Santalaceae, Viscaceae. Pp. 404–440 in: Flora North America, Volume 12, Flora North America Editorial Committee (eds.), Oxford University Press, New York. Flora of North America online: Volume 12
- Pelser, P. B., D. L. Nickrent, & J. F. Barcelona. 2016. Untangling a vine and its parasite: Host specificity of Philippine Rafflesia (Rafflesiaceae). Taxon 65(4):739–758. For Supplemental data.
- Pelser, P.B., D. L. Nickrent, A. R. T. Reintar, & J. F. Barcelona. (2016) Lepeostegeres cebuensis (Loranthaceae), a new mistletoe species from Cebu, Philippines. Phytotaxa 266(1):48–52.
- Pearse, I. S., G. Spyreas, D. Nickrent, P. Anders, A. Epstein, & M. Greenwood. (2015) Illinois Plants (www.inhs.illinois.edu/data/plantdb) is here: A new online resource for botanists and plant enthusiasts in Illinois. Natural History Survey Reports No. 413 (10): 19–20.3.
- Devkota, Mohan P.; Macklin, Jill; Nickrent, Daniel L. (2015). "The status of the mistletoe genus Dufrenoya Chatin (Amphorogynaceae) with a specific focus on Nepal". Flora – Morphology, Distribution, Functional Ecology of Plants. 215: 75–83. doi:10.1016/j.flora.2015.07.009. ISSN 0367-2530.
- Kleunen, M.v., Dawson, W., Essl, F., Pergl, J., Winter, M., Weber, E., Kreft, H., Weigelt, P., Kartesz, J., Nishino, M., Antonov, L., Barcelona, J., Cabezas, F., Cardenas, D., Cardenas-Toro, J., Castaño, N., Chacón, E., Chatelain, C., Ebel, A., Figueiredo, E., Fuentes, N., Groom, Q., Henderson, L., Inderjit, Kupriyanov, A., Masciadri, S., Meerman, J., Morozova, O., Moser, D., Nickrent, D., Patzelt, A., Pelser, P., Baptiste, M., Poopath, M., Schulze, M., Seebens, H., Shu, W.-S., Thomas, J., Velayos, M., Wieringa, J., & Pyšek, P. 2015. Global exchange and accumulation of non-native plants. Nature 525:100–104.
- Nickrent, Daniel Lee; García, Miguel Angel (2015). "Lacomucinaea, a new monotypic genus in Thesiaceae (Santalales)". Phytotaxa. 224 (2): 173. doi:10.11646/phytotaxa.224.2.4. ISSN 1179-3163. S2CID 84074681.
- Su, Huei-Jiun; Hu, Jer-Ming; Anderson, Frank E.; Der, Joshua P.; Nickrent, Daniel L. (2015). "Phylogenetic relationships of Santalales with insights into the origins of holoparasitic Balanophoraceae". Taxon. 64 (3): 491–506. doi:10.12705/643.2. ISSN 0040-0262. S2CID 92132324. pdf
- Sipes S. D., K. E. Huff Hartz, H. Amin, A. Anterola, and D. L. Nickrent. 2014. Floral scent and pollinators of the holoparasite Pilostyles thurberi (Apodanthaceae). Journal of Pollination Ecology 12: 31–39.
- Amico, Guillermo C.; Vidal-Russell, Romina; Aizen, Marcelo A.; Nickrent, Daniel (2013). "Genetic diversity and population structure of the mistletoe Tristerix corymbosus (Loranthaceae)". Plant Systematics and Evolution. 300 (1): 153–162. doi:10.1007/s00606-013-0867-x. ISSN 0378-2697. S2CID 10919921.
- Barcelona J. F., D. L. Nickrent, J. V. LaFrankie, J. R. C. Callado and P. B. Pelser. 2013. Co's digital flora of the Philippines: plant identification and conservation through cybertaxonomy. Philippine Journal of Science 142: 57–67.
- Pelser, Pieter B.; Nickrent, Daniel L.; Callado, John Rey C.; Barcelona, Julie F. (2013). "Mt. Banahaw reveals: The resurrection and neotypification of the name Rafflesia lagascae (Rafflesiaceae) and clues to the dispersal of Rafflesia seeds". Phytotaxa. 131 (1): 35. doi:10.11646/phytotaxa.131.1.6. ISSN 1179-3163. S2CID 85379588.
- Gonzalo, R.; Aedo, C.; Nickrent, D. L.; García, M. A. (2012). "A Numerical Taxonomic Investigation of Stipa Sect. Smirnovia and S. Sect. Subsmirnovia (Poaceae)" (PDF). Systematic Botany. 37 (3): 655–670. doi:10.1600/036364412X648607. hdl:10261/94515. ISSN 0363-6445. S2CID 85981239.
- Nickrent, D.L. 2012. Justification for subspecies in Arceuthobium campylopodum (Viscaceae). Phytoneuron 51: 1–11.
- Amico, Guillermo C.; Vidal-Russell, Romina; Garcia, Miguel A.; Nickrent, Daniel L. (2012). "Evolutionary History of the South American Mistletoe Tripodanthus (Loranthaceae) Using Nuclear and Plastid Markers". Systematic Botany. 37 (1): 218–225. doi:10.1600/036364412X616783. ISSN 0363-6445. S2CID 86031445.
- Judd, W.S., Nickrent, D.L., Robertson, K.R., Abbott, J.R., Carlsward, B.S., Schuster, T.M., Campbell, C.S., Neubig, K.M., Zona, S., Donoghue, M.J. & Kellogg, E.A. (2011) Photo Gallery of Vascular Plants Sinauer Associates ISBN 9781605355740
- Barcelona, J.F., E.S. Fernando, D.L. Nickrent, D.S. Balete, and P.B. Pelser. 2011. An amended description of Rafflesia leonardi and a revised key to Philippine Rafflesia (Rafflesiaceae). Phytotaxa 24: 11–18.
- Nickrent, D. L. 2011. Santalales (Including Mistletoes). Encyclopedia of Life Science. John Wiley & Sons, Ltd.: Chichester doi:10.1002/9780470015902.a0003714.pub2
- Balete D. S., P. B. Pelser, D. L. Nickrent, and J. F. Barcelona. 2010. "Rafflesia verrucosa (Rafflesiaceae), a new species of small-flowered Rafflesia from Mindanao, Philippines." Phytotaxa 10: 49–57.
- Ulloa, C.U., D.L. Nickrent, C. Whitefoord, and D.L. Kelly. 2010. Hondurodendron, a new monotypic genus of Aptandraceae from Honduras. Annals of the Missouri Botanical Garden 97: 457–467. Correction (2011)
- Govaerts, Rafaël; Nickrent, Daniel L. (2010). "658. Cytinus ruber". Curtis's Botanical Magazine. 26 (4): 314–321. doi:10.1111/j.1467-8748.2009.01669.x. ISSN 1355-4905.
- Nickrent, D. L. 1987. Systematics and population biology of two sibling species of Arceuthobium (dwarf mistletoes, Viscaceae). Pp. 597-611 In: Proceedings of the 4th. International Symposium on Parasitic Flowering Plants, Phillipps University, Marburg, West Germany, August 2–7, 1987. Eds. H. C. Weber, W. Forstreuter.
- Nickrent, D. L. 1986. Genetic polymorphism in the morphologically reduced dwarf mistletoes (Arceuthobium, Viscaceae): an electrophoretic study. American Journal of Botany 73:1492–1502.
- Nickrent, D. L., S. I. Guttman, and W. H. Eshbaugh. 1984. Biosystematic and evolutionary relationships among selected taxa of Arceuthobium. pp. 20–35 In: Proceedings of the Symposium on the Biology of Dwarf Mistletoes, Aug. 8, 1984, Technical Coordinators F. Hawksworth and R. Scharpf.
