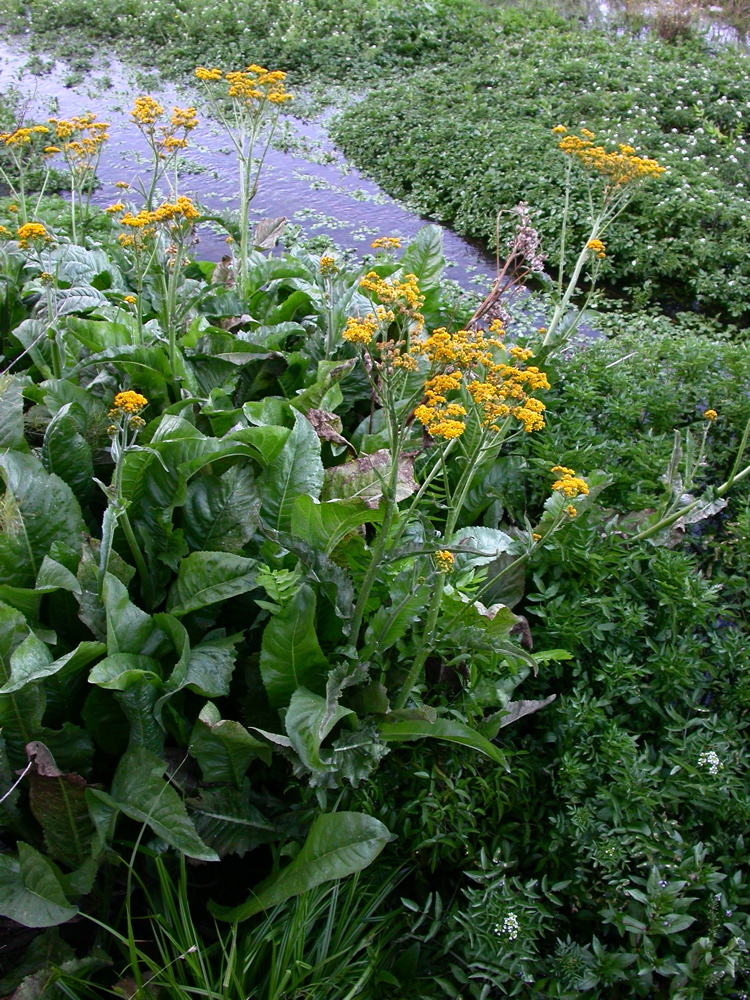

Scientific classification
- Kingdom: Plantae
- Clade: Embryophytes
- Clade: Tracheophytes
- Clade: Spermatophytes
- Clade: Angiosperms
- Clade: Eudicots
- Clade: Asterids
- Order: Asterales
- Family: Asteraceae
- Genus: Senecio
- Species: S. fistulosus

Binomial name
- Senecio fistulosus Poepp. ex DC. (1838) Source: IPNI

= Senecio fistulosus =

Species of flowering plant

Senecio fistulosus is a species of the genus Senecio, family Asteraceae and one of the many species of Senecio native to Chile, where it is known as a hualtata.

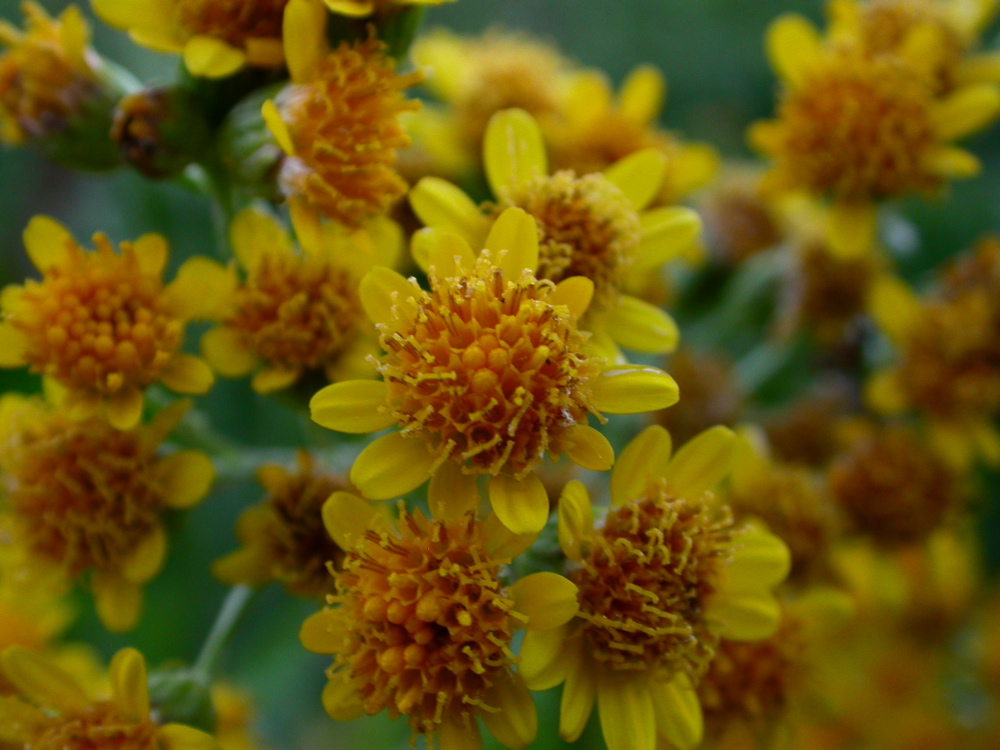
Flower of S. fistulosus
