= Job Kuijt =

Canadian botanist (born 1930)

- Born: 25 May 1930; Velsen
- Died: 15 December 2024 (aged 94)
- Education: University of Victoria
- Scientific career
- Fields: Botany, Taxonomy
- Author abbrev. (botany): Kuijt

Job Kuijt (25 May 1930 – 15 December 2024), was a Dutch-born Canadian botanist, with a particular interest in parasitic plants, including Viscaceae, Loranthaceae and Eremolepidaceae.

The standard author abbreviation Kuijt is used to indicate this person as the author when citing a botanical name.

== Life and Career ==
Born in 1930 in Velsen, the Netherlands, he migrated to British Columbia in 1948.

in 1958 he was awarded a Ph.D. from UC, Berkeley. From 1968 to 1989 he worked as an associate professor in the Department of Biological Sciences at the University of Lethbridge, in Alberta. He later worked as professor at the University of Victoria in British Columbia.

He was awarded a Guggenheim fellowship in 1964, and the George Lawson Medal in 1971 by the Canadian Botanical Association.

== Names published ==
(incomplete list: query lists some 645 names-some repeated)

- Antidaphne andina Kuijt—Fl. Ecuador 24(32A): 7. 1986
- Antidaphne antidaphnoides (Rizzini) Kuijt—Syst. Bot. Monogr. 18: 26. 1988
- Antidaphne glaziovii (Tiegh.) Kuijt—Syst. Bot. Monogr. 18: 26. 1988
- Antidaphne hondurensis Kuijt—Novon 8: 402, fig. 1–6. 1998
- Aetanthus dichotomus (Ruiz & Pav.) Kuijt—Fl. Ecuador 24: 167. 1986
- Aetanthus macranthus (Hook.) Kuijt—Fl. Ecuador 24(32C): 169. 1986
- Aetanthus megaphyllus Kuijt—Pl. Diversity Evol. 131(1-3): 20. 2014
- Aetanthus pascoensis Kuijt—Pl. Diversity Evol. 131(1-3): 33. 2014
- Aetanthus prolongatus Kuijt—Pl. Diversity Evol. 131(1-3): 36. 2014
- Aetanthus sessilifolius Kuijt—Pl. Diversity Evol. 131(1-3): 38. 2014
- Aetanthus tachirensis Kuijt—Pl. Diversity Evol. 131(1-3): 40. 2014
- Phoradendron nickrentianum Kuijt, Novon 21(4): 456 (2011).

(These may not be accepted names.)

== Selected publications ==
- Job Kuijt (1969), The Biology of Parasitic Flowering Plants, Berkeley, OL 19339570W, Wikidata Q112657489
- Daniel L. Nickrent; Frank Anderson; Job Kuijt (11 March 2019). "Inflorescence evolution in Santalales: integrating morphological characters and molecular phylogenetics" (PDF). American Journal of Botany. 106 (3): 402–414. doi:10.1002/AJB2.1250. ISSN 0002-9122. PMID 30856677. Wikidata Q92271600.
- Job Kuijt; Bertel Hansen (2015), Flowering Plants. Eudicots: Santalales, Balanophorales, The Families and Genera of Vascular Plants, vol. 12, doi:10.1007/978-3-319-09296-6, Wikidata Q57320004
- Job Kuijt; Bertel Hansen (9 August 2014). "Loranthaceae: Loranthaceae Juss., Ann. Mus. Hist. Nat. Paris 12: 292 (1808) ('Loranthaea'), nom. cons.; Barlow, Flora Males. I, 13: 209–401 (1997); Polhill and Wiens, Mistletoes of Africa, Royal Bot. Gard. Kew (1998).Loranthaceae subfam. Loranthoideae Eaton, Bot. Dict., ed. 4: 37 (1836).Elytranthaceae Tiegh. (1896).Nuytsiaceae Tiegh. (1896).Gaiadendraceae Tiegh. ex Nakai (1952).Psittacanthaceae Nakai (1952)". Flowering Plants. Eudicots. Santalales, Balanophorales. The Families and Genera of Vascular Plants. 12: 73–119. doi:10.1007/978-3-319-09296-6_14. Wikidata Q139683782.
- Kuijt, Job, (2009) "Monograph of Psittacanthus (Loranthaceae)." 361-pp.
- Job Kuijt (1988). "Revision of Tristerix (Loranthaceae)" (PDF). Systematic Botany Monographs. 19: 1. doi:10.2307/25027693. ISSN 0737-8211. JSTOR 25027693. Wikidata Q55767908.
- Job Kuijt; R. TOTH (November 1976). "Ultrastructure of Angiosperm Haustoria—A Review". Annals of Botany. 40 (6): 1121–1130. doi:10.1093/OXFORDJOURNALS.AOB.A085232. ISSN 0305-7364. Wikidata Q139595335.
- Job Kuijt (31 December 1969). The Biology of Parasitic Flowering Plants. doi:10.1525/9780520417793. ISBN 978-0-520-41779-3. Wikidata Q139595117.
- Job Kuijt (December 1955). "Dwarf Mistletoes" (PDF). The Botanical Review (in German). 21 (10): 569–619. doi:10.1007/BF02872378. ISSN 0006-8101. Wikidata Q139595101.
