= Julie F. Barcelona =

Filipino botanist (born 1972)

Julie F. Barcelona (born January 1, 1972) is a Filipina botanist and taxonomist working as Research Associate at University of Canterbury (Christchurch, New Zealand). She is mostly known for her research on the Philippine members of the genus Rafflesia.

Barcelona worked on Co's Digital Flora of the Philippines, a website dedicated to the great Philippine botanist Leonard Co.

Barcelona is married to Pieter B. Pelser, with which she wrote most of her work. The pitcher plant species Nepenthes barcelonae was named after her.

== Education ==
Barcelona graduated from West Visayas State University, where she earned her Bachelor of Science in biological sciences in 1987. In 1994, Barcelona went on to receive her master's degree in biological science at the University of Santo Tomas in Espana, Manila. Barcelona completed her academic studies with a Ph.D. in botany at Miami University in Oxford, Ohio, in 2000.

== Publications ==
- Barcelona, J.F., Pieter B. Pelser & M.O. Cajano. 2007. Rafflesia banahaw (Rafflesiaceae), a new species from Luzon, Philippines. Blumea 52: 345–350.
- Barcelona, J.F., P.B. Pelser, E.M. Cabutaje & N.A. Bartolome. 2008. Another new species of Rafflesia (Rafflesiaceae) from Luzon, Philippines: R. leonardi. Blumea 53: 223–228.
- Barcelona, J.F., P.B. Pelser, Danilo S. Balete & Leonard Co. 2009. Taxonomy, ecology, and conservation status of Philippine Rafflesia (Rafflesiaceae). Blumea 54: 77–93.
- Balete, D.S., P.B. Pelser, Daniel Lee Nickrent & J.F. Barcelona. 2010. Rafflesia verrucosa (Rafflesiaceae), a new species of small-flowered Rafflesia from eastern Mindanao, Philippines. Phytotaxa 10: 49–57.
- Barcelona, J.F., E.S. Fernando, D.L. Nickrent, D.S. Balete & P.B. Pelser. 2011. An amended description of Rafflesia leonardi and a revised key to Philippine Rafflesia (Rafflesiaceae). Phytotaxa 24: 11–18.
- Pelser, Pieter B.; Barcelona, Julie F. (2013). "Discovery through photography: Amyema nickrentii, a new species of Loranthaceae from Aurora Province, Philippines" (PDF). Phytotaxa. 125 (1): 47. Bibcode:2013Phytx.125...47P. doi:10.11646/phytotaxa.125.1.7. ISSN 1179-3163. S2CID 83621288. Archived from the original (PDF) on 2020-02-19.
- Pelser, P.B., D.L. Nickrent, J.R.C. Callado & J.F. Barcelona. 2013. Mt. Banahaw reveals: The resurrection and neotypification of the name Rafflesia lagascae (Rafflesiaceae) and clues to the dispersal of Rafflesia seeds Phytotaxa 131: 35–40.
- Barcelona, J.F.; Manting, M.M.E.; Arbolonio, R.B.; Carballero, R.B.; Pelser, P.B. (2014). "Rafflesia mixta (Rafflesiaceae), a new species from Surigao del Norte, Mindanao, Philippines". Phytotaxa. 174 (5): 272. Bibcode:2014Phytx.174..272B. doi:10.11646/phytotaxa.174.5.3. ISSN 1179-3163. pdf
- Molina, J.; Hazzouri, Khaled M.; Nickrent, D.L.; Geisler, M.; Meyer, R.S.; Pentony, M.M.; Flowers, J.; Pelser, Pieter; Barcelona, J.; Inovejas, S.A.; Uy, I.s; Yuan, W.; Wilkins, O.; Michel, C.-I.; LockLear, S.; Concepcion, G.P.; Purugganan, M.D. (2014). "Possible Loss of the Chloroplast Genome in the Parasitic Flowering Plant Rafflesia lagascae (Rafflesiaceae)". Molecular Biology and Evolution. 31 (4): 793–803. doi:10.1093/molbev/msu051. ISSN 1537-1719. PMC 3969568. PMID 24458431.
- Pelser, P.B., D.N. Tandang & J.F. Barcelona. 2014. Balanophora coralliformis (Balanophoraceae), a new species from Mt. Mingan, Luzon, Philippines. Phytotaxa 170: 291–295.
