= Pieter B. Pelser =

New Zealand botanist (born 1976)

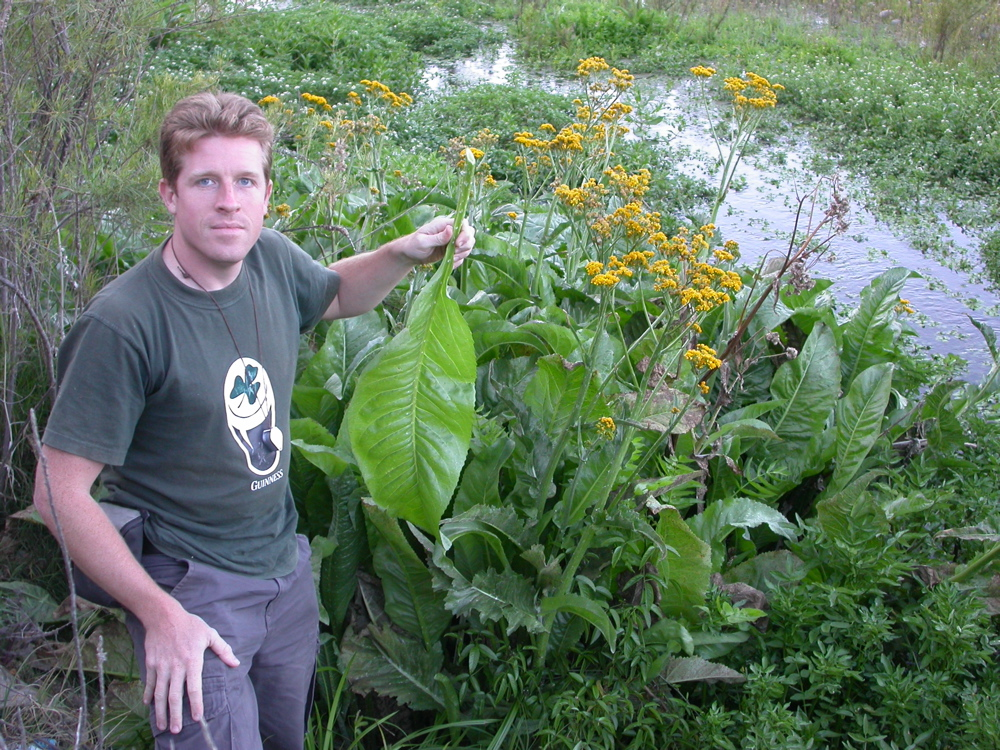
Dr. Pieter B. Pelser and a leaf of Senecio fistulosus

Pieter B. Pelser (born 12 January 1976) is a professor in Plant Systematics and the curator of the herbarium at the University of Canterbury in Christchurch, New Zealand. One research interest is the evolutionary history of the tribe Senecioneae, one of the largest tribes in the largest family of flowering plants. He wrote the most recent attempt to define and delimit this tribe and its problematic founding species Senecio. He also studies insects that eat these plants (Longitarsus) which contain pyrrolizidine alkaloids and what makes them choose which plants they eat.

== Life ==
Pieter B. Pelser was born in Wijchen, a town in the province of Gelderland, in the eastern part of the Netherlands. He is married to Philippine pteridologist Julie F. Barcelona.

Pelser is Senior Lecturer in Plant Systematics, University of Canterbury

=== Co's Digital Flora of the Philippines ===
Pieter B. Pelser is a co-founder and a main editor for Co's Digital Flora of the Philippines, a website dedicated to collating photos of Philippine Botanical Species.

== Other projects ==
Research on the Philippine members of the genus Rafflesia, which has the biggest flowers of any plant, and in particular the conservation of them.

== Publications by Pelser ==
- Barcelona, J.F., M.M.E. Manting, R.B. Arbolonio, R.B. Caballero & P.B. Pelser. 2014. Rafflesia mixta (Rafflesiaceae), a new species from Surigao del Norte, Mindanao, Philippines. Phytotaxa 174: 272–278.
- Barcelona, J.F. & P.B. Pelser. 2014. Phanerosorus (Matoniaceae), a new fern genus record for the Philippines. Phytotaxa 170: 133–135.
- de Lange, P.J., J.R. Rolfe, C.S. Liew & P.B. Pelser. 2014. Senecio australis Willd. (Asteraceae: Senecioneae) - a new and uncommon addition to the indigenous flora of New Zealand. New Zealand Journal of Botany 52: 417–428.
- Molina, J.E., K.M. Hazzouri, D.L. Nickrent, M. Geisler, R.S. Meyer, M.M. Pentony, J.M. Flowers, P.B. Pelser, J.F. Barcelona, S.A. Inovejas, I. Uy, W. Yuan, O. Wilkins, C.-I. Michel, S. LockLear, G.P. Concepcion & M.D. Purugganan. 2014. Possible loss of the chloroplast genome in the parasitic flowering plant Rafflesia lagascae (Rafflesiaceae). Molecular Biology and Evolution 31: 793–803.
- Pelser, P.B., D.N. Tandang & J.F. Barcelona. 2014. Balanophora coralliformis (Balanophoraceae), a new species from Mt. Mingan, Luzon, Philippines. Phytotaxa 170: 291–295.
- Journé, V., J.F. Barcelona, J.V. LaFrankie & P.B. Pelser. 2014. Stylidium javanicum (Stylidiaceae), a new triggerplant record for the Philippines. Phytotaxa 186: 113–116.
- Barcelona, J.F., D.L. Nickrent, J.V. LaFrankie, J.R.C. Callado & P.B. Pelser. 2013. Co's Digital Flora of the Philippines: plant identification and conservation through cybertaxonomy. Philippine Journal of Science 142 (special issue): 57–67.
- Pelser, P.B., D.L. Nickrent, J.R.C. Callado & J.F. Barcelona. 2013. Mt. Banahaw reveals: The resurrection and neotypification of the name Rafflesia lagascae (Rafflesiaceae) and clues to the dispersal of Rafflesia seeds Phytotaxa 131: 35–40.
- Pelser, P.B. & J.F. Barcelona. 2013. Discovery through photography: Amyema nickrentii, a new species of Loranthaceae from Aurora Province, Philippines. Phytotaxa 125: 47–52.
- Calvo, J., I. Álvarez, C. Aedo & P.B. Pelser. 2013. A phylogenetic analysis and new delimitation of Senecio sect. Crociseris (Compositae: Senecioneae), with evidence of intergeneric hybridization. Taxon 62: 127–140.
- Roda, F., L. Ambrose, G. M. Walter, H. L. Liu, A. Schaul, A. Lowe, P. B. Pelser, P. Prentis, L. H. Rieseberg & D. Ortiz-Barrientos. 2013. Genomic evidence for the parallel evolution of coastal forms in the Senecio lautus complex. Molecular Ecology 22: 2941–2952.
- Mennes, C.B., R.D. Smissen & P.B. Pelser. 2012. AFLP analyses do not provide support for recognizing Brachyglottis saxifragoides as a species distinct from B. lagopus (Asteraceae; Senecioneae). New Zealand Journal of Botany 50: 489–495.
- Pelser, P.B., R.J. Abbott, H.P. Comes, J.J. Milton, M. Möller, M.E. Loosely, G.V. Cron, J.F. Barcelona, A.H. Kennedy, L.E. Watson, R. Barone, F. Hernández, & J.W. Kadereit. 2012. The genetic ghost of an invasion past: colonization and extinction revealed by historical hybridization in Senecio. Molecular Ecology 21: 369–387.
- Kirk, H., K. Vrieling, P.B. Pelser & U. Schaffner. 2012. Can plant resistance to specialist herbivores be explained by plant chemistry or resource use strategy? Oecologia 168: 1043–1055.
- Barcelona, J.F., E.S. Fernando, D.L. Nickrent, D.S. Balete & P.B. Pelser. 2011. An amended description of Rafflesia leonardi and a revised key to Philippine Rafflesia (Rafflesiaceae). Phytotaxa 24: 11–18.
- Langel, D., D. Ober & P.B. Pelser. 2011. The evolution of pyrrolizidine alkaloid biosynthesis and diversity in the Senecioneae. Phytochemistry Reviews 10: 3-74.
- Balete, D.S., P.B. Pelser, D.L. Nickrent & J.F. Barcelona. 2010. Rafflesia verrucosa (Rafflesiaceae), a new species of small-flowered Rafflesia from eastern Mindanao, Philippines. Phytotaxa 10: 49–57.
- Pelser, P.B., E.J. Tepe, A.H. Kennedy & L.E. Watson. 2010. The fate of Robinsonia (Senecioneae; Asteraceae): sunk in Senecio, but still monophyletic? Phytotaxa 5: 31–46.
- Pelser, P.B., A.H. Kennedy, E.J. Tepe, J.B. Shidler, B. Nordenstam, J.W. Kadereit & L.E. Watson. 2010. Patterns and causes of incongruence between plastid and nuclear Senecioneae (Asteraceae) phylogenies. American Journal of Botany 97: 856–873.
- Barcelona, J.F., P.B. Pelser, D.S. Balete & L.L. Co. 2009. Taxonomy, ecology, and conservation status of Philippine Rafflesia (Rafflesiaceae). Blumea 54: 77–93.
- Funk, V.A. & numerous authors. 2009. Compositae meta-trees: the next generation. In: Funk, V.A., A. Susanna, T. Stuessy & R. Bayer (eds.). Systematics, evolution & biogeography of the Compositae, 747-777, IAPT, Vienna, Austria.
- Nordenstam, B., P.B. Pelser, J.W. Kadereit & L.E. Watson. 2009. Senecioneae In: Funk, V.A., A. Susanna, T. Stuessy & R. Bayer (eds.). Systematics, evolution & biogeography of the Compositae, 503–535, IAPT, Vienna, Austria.
- Pelser, P.B. & L.E. Watson. 2009. Introduction to Asteroideae. In: Funk, V.A., A. Susanna, T. Stuessy & R. Bayer (eds.). Systematics, evolution & biogeography of the Compositae, 495–502, IAPT, Vienna, Austria.
- Wang, L.-Y., P.B. Pelser, B. Nordenstam & J.-Q. Liu. 2009. Strong incongruence between the ITS phylogeny and generic delimitation in the Nemosenecio-Sinosenecio-Tephroseris assemblage (Asteraceae: Senecioneae). Botanical studies 50: 435–442.
- Barcelona, J.F., P.B. Pelser, E.M. Cabutaje & N.A. Bartolome. 2008. Another new species of Rafflesia (Rafflesiaceae) from Luzon, Philippines: R. leonardi. Blumea 53: 223–228.
- Pelser, P.B., B. Nordenstam, J.W. Kadereit & L.E. Watson. 2007. An ITS phylogeny of Tribe Senecioneae (Asteraceae) and a new delimitation of Senecio L. Taxon 56: 1077–1104.
- Barcelona, J.F., P.B. Pelser & M.O. Cajano. 2007. Rafflesia banahaw (Rafflesiaceae), a new species from Luzon, Philippines. Blumea 52: 345–350.
- Pelser, P.B., H. de Vos, H.C. Theuring, T. Beuerle, K. Vrieling & T. Hartmann. 2005. Frequent gain and loss of pyrrolizidine alkaloids in the evolution of Senecio sect. Jacobaea (Asteraceae). Phytochemistry 66: 1285–1286.
- Pelser, P.B. & R. Houchin. 2004. Taxonomic studies in Senecio aquaticus Hill s.l. (Asteraceae). A recommendation for the taxonomic status of Aquaticus and Barbareifolius. Botanical Journal of the Linnean Society 145: 489–498.
- Pelser, P.B., K. van den Hof, B. Gravendeel & R. van der Meijden. 2004. The systematic value of morphological characters in Senecio sect. Jacobaea (Asteraceae). Systematic Botany 29: 790–805.
- Pelser, P.B., B. Gravendeel, & R. van der Meijden. 2003 Phylogeny reconstruction in the gap between too little and too much divergence: the closest relatives of Senecio jacobaea (Asteraceae) according to DNA sequences and AFLPs. Molecular Phylogenetics and Evolution 29: 613–628.
- Pelser, P.B., B. Gravendeel, & R. van der Meijden. 2002a. Tackling speciose genera: species composition and phylogenetic position of Senecio sect. Jacobaea (Asteraceae) based on plastid and nrDNA sequences. American Journal of Botany 89: 929–939.
- Pelser, P.B., J.D. Kruijer & R. Verpoorte. 2002b. What is the function of oil containing rudimentary branches of Canalohypopterygium tamariscinum (Hypopterygiaceae; Musci)? New Zealand Journal of Botany 40: 149–153.
- Pelser, P.B., B. Gravendeel, & E.F. de Vogel. 2000. Revision of Coelogyne sect. Fuliginosae (Orchidaceae). Blumea 45: 253–273.

== Books ==
- Montelle, C., A. Pratt, K. Pickles, U. Rack, R.N. Holdaway, P.B. Pelser, P.B. & W.R. Sykes. 2011. Exploration & Discovery. In: C. Jones, B. Matthews & J. Clement (eds.). Treasures of the University of Canterbury Library. Canterbury University Press, Christchurch, pp. 187–217.
- Bakker, F.T., L.W. Chatrou, B. Gravendeel & P.B. Pelser (eds.). 2005. Plant species-level systematics: Patterns, processes and new applications. Regnum Vegetabile 142. 347 pp.
- Pelser, P.B. 2000a. Araliaceae, Bignoniaceae, Melastomataceae, Meliaceae, Piperaceae, Simaroubaceae, Tiliaceae, Urticaceae & Verbenaceae. In: P.J.A. Keßler (ed.). Secondary forest trees of Kalimantan, Indonesia. Tropenbos Kalimantan series 3. Tropenbos Foundation, Wageningen. 404 pp.
- Bodegom, S., P.B. Pelser & P.J.A. Keßler. 1999. Seedlings of secondary forest tree species of East Kalimantan, Indonesia - Semai-semai pohon hutan sekunder di Kalimantan Timur, Indonesia. Tropenbos Kalimantan series 1. Tropenbos Foundation, Wageningen. 371 pp.

== Multi-media ==
- Bodegom, S., P.B. Pelser & P.J.A. Keßler. 2003. Tree seedlings of Indonesia, key to secondary forest seedlings of East Kalimantan (CD-ROM). ETI, Amsterdam.

Non-refereed Articles:

- Nordenstam, B. & P.B. Pelser. 2012. Caputia, a new genus to accommodate four succulent South African Senecioneae (Compositae) species. Compositae Newsletter 50: 56–69.
- Nordenstam, B. P.B. Pelser & L.E. Watson. 2009. The South African aquatic genus Cadiscus (Compositae-Senecioneae) sunk in Senecio. Compositae Newsletter 47: 28–32.
- Nordenstam, B. P.B. Pelser & L.E. Watson. 2009. Lomanthus, a new genus of the Compositae-Senecioneae from Ecuador, Peru, Bolivia and Argentina. Compositae Newsletter 47: 33–40.
- Pelser, P.B. 2009. The importance of molecular characters for taxonomy and studies of plant evolution. Gorteria 33: 31–27.
- Pelser, P.B., J.-F. Veldkamp, & R. van der Meijden. 2006. New combinations in Jacobaea Mill. (Asteraceae – Senecioneae). Compositae Newsletter 44: 1–11.
- Nordenstam, B. & P.B. Pelser. 2005. Dauresia and Mesogramma, two monotypic genera of the Asteraceae-Senecioneae from Southern Africa. Compositae Newsletter 42: 74–88.
- Pelser, P.B. 2003. Disassembling the Scrophulariaceae. Gorteria 29: 117–124.
- Pelser, P.B. 2002a. Why classifications change, examples from the Primrose family (Primulaceae). Gorteria 28: 89–92.
- Pelser, P.B. 2002b. Tracking evolutionary relationships in Orchids: name changes as a consequence of modern systematics research. Gorteria 28: 113–118.
- Pelser, P.B. 2000b. Molecular evolution in systematics. Gorteria 26: 249–250.

Newsletters:

- Barcelona, J.F. & P.B.Pelser. 2008. The story continues... the 8th Philippine species of Rafflesia, R. leonardi, discovered and named. Art-i-Facts 10(2): 6.
- Barcelona, J.F., P.B. Pelser, A.M. Tagtag, R.G. Dahonog & A.P. Lilangan. 2008. The rediscovery of Rafflesia schadenbergiana Göpp. ex Hieron. (Rafflesiaceae). Flora Malesiana Bulletin 14: 162–165.
- Pelser, P.B. & P.J.A. Keßler. 1999. Botanical diversity at the International MOFEC-Tropenbos-Kalimantan-Project, East Kalimantan, Indonesia. ETFRN News 29: 33–34.

Book Reviews:

- Pelser, P.B. 2012. New Zealand's native trees by John Dawson and Rob Lucas. New Zealand Journal of Botany 50: 95–96.

Popular Articles:

- Hegt, E. & P.B. Pelser. 2007a. Common Ragwort. Prevention is easier than eradication. Paard en Sport (6): 70–71.
- Hegt, E. & P.B. Pelser. 2007b. Common Ragwort, facts and myths. Agrarisch Vakblad 4 (3): 3 and 4 (5): 7.
- Pelser, P.B. 2000c. Competition – Naturally. Het Financieele Dagblad 26: 30.
