= Rafflesia Forest Reserve =

Protected area in Sabah, Malaysia

- IUCN category Ia (strict nature reserve)
- Location within Borneo
- Location: Sabah, Malaysia
- Coordinates: 05°46.64′N 116°20.60′E
- Area: 356 hectares (880 acres)
- Established: 1984

The Rafflesia Forest Reserve is a Virgin Jungle Reserve (VJR) that covers an area of 356 hectares (880 acres) in Tambunan District of Sabah, Malaysia. The reserve was first established in 1967 as part of the Crocker Range Forest Reserve (now Crocker Range National Park). In 1984, it was made a separate reserve by the Sabah Forestry Department to protect the area's Rafflesia flowers.

The Rafflesia Information Centre is located along the road from Kota Kinabalu to Tambunan. Several sites with wild specimens of the parasitic flowering plant Rafflesia pricei are reachable via hiking trails from the centre.

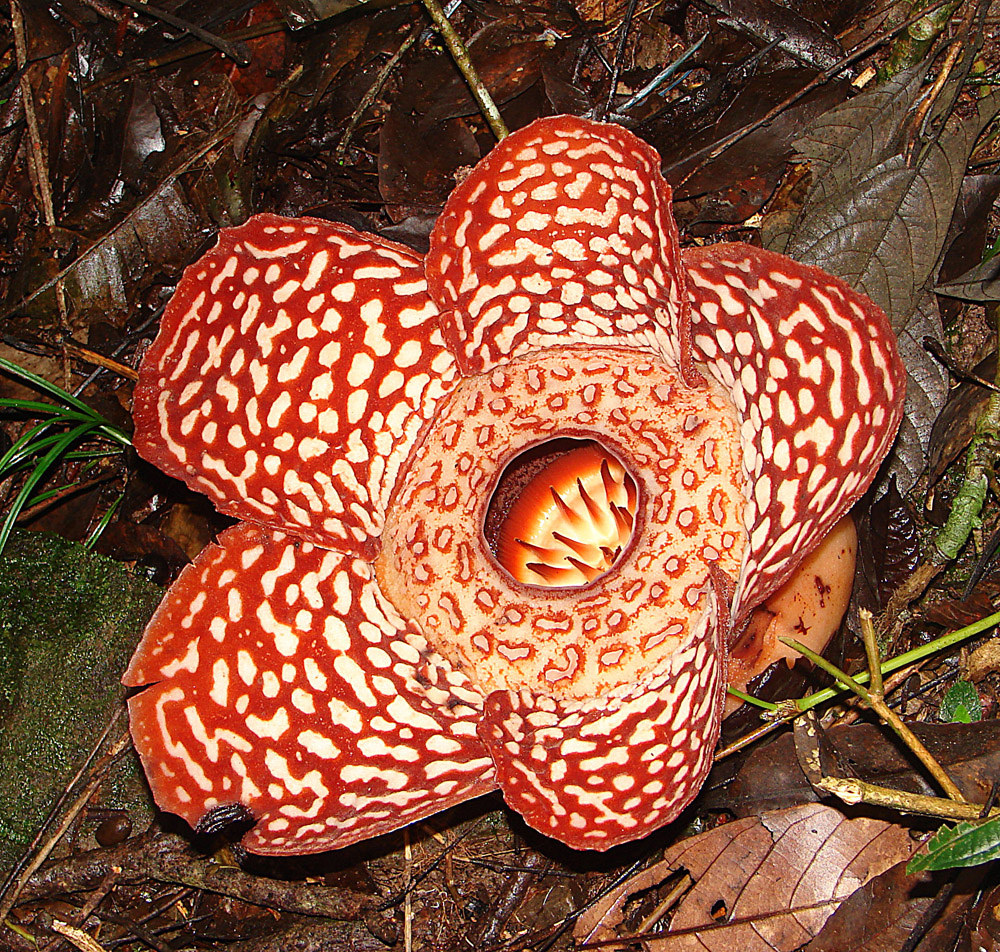
Rafflesia pricei, a flowering plant commonly seen in the Rafflesia Forest Reserve.

== Flora ==
Rafflesia Forest Reserve is home to Rafflesia pricei and its host plant Tetrastigma leucostaphylum. The reserve is also home to montane forest tree species such as Shorea platyclados (now Rubroshorea platyclados), Agathis kinabaluensis, Lithocarpus lucidus, Palaquium gutta, Shorea smithiana, Prainea limpato and Quercus kinabaluensis. Kerangas forest tree species in the reserve include Schima wallichii and Elaeocarpus stipularis.

== Fauna ==
Rafflesia Forest Reserve is home to a number of insect species endemic to Borneo, including Lyclene mesilaulinea, Problepsis borneamagna, Spilosoma ericsoni and Utetheisa abraxoides.
