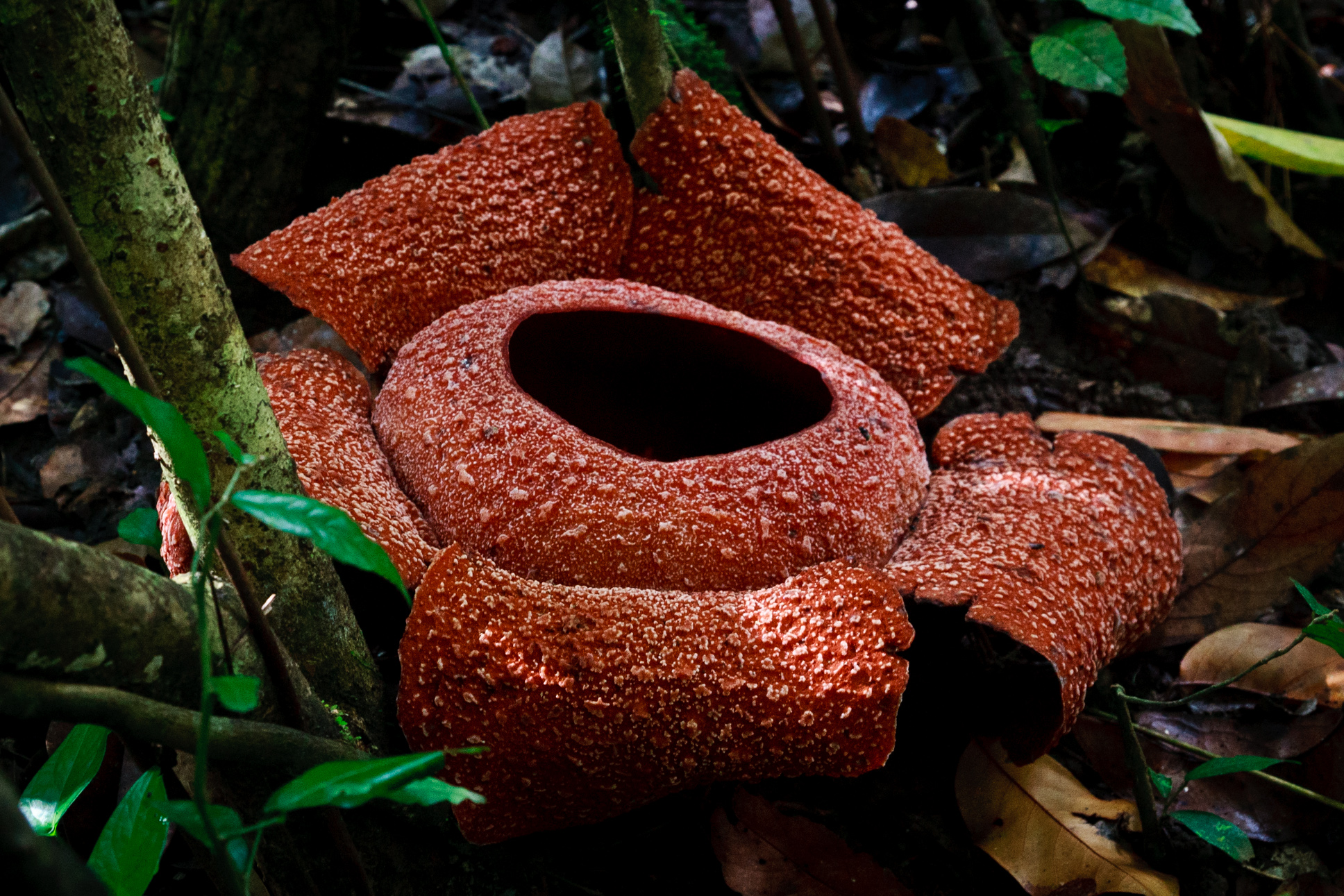
- Rafflesia zollingeriana found at Krecek Block, National Park Management Section Region II Ambulu, Meru Betiri National Park, Jember, East Java, Indonesia.

Scientific classification
- Kingdom: Plantae
- Clade: Tracheophytes
- Clade: Angiosperms
- Clade: Eudicots
- Clade: Rosids
- Order: Malpighiales
- Family: Rafflesiaceae
- Genus: Rafflesia
- Species: R. zollingeriana

Binomial name
- Rafflesia zollingeriana Koord.

= Rafflesia zollingeriana =

Species of flowering plant

Rafflesia zollingeriana is a species of flowering plant in the family Rafflesiaceae, native to Java. Of three species of Rafflesia known from Java, this species has always been the most rare and restricted. It is only known from collection locales in Banyuwangi Regency, Jember Regency and Lumajang Regency, southern East Java. It was first scientifically collected in 1902 by Sijfert Hendrik Koorders on the eastern flanks of Mount Puger Watangan, a forested hill near the beach, who described it as a new species in 1918. Many decades later, a flowering plant was discovered in Meru Betiri National Park, and also in the Jember Regency, somewhat further down the coast to the east.

Locals in Jember and Lumajang Regency know this plant by the name of patmo sari, patmosari and/or padmosari in Javanese. The word sari means 'essence' or 'the best part of', patmo is generally used to mean Rafflesia locally, but is originally etymologically derived from the Sanskrit word पद्म (padma), 'lotus', and also still means 'lotus' in literary Javanese.

== Taxonomy ==
Rafflesia zollingeriana was first described by Dutch-Indonesian botanist Sijfert Hendrik Koorders in his 1918 monograph on the Rafflesiaceae of Indonesia. He had collected the holotype in 1902, not far from the beach (Pantai Puger) near the village and forestry research station (boschproefstation) of Puger, in what is now the Jember Regency, on a hill called Puger Watangan.

In 1997, the Rafflesiaceae expert Willem Meijer synonymised R. zollingeriana with R. patma. Other Rafflesiaceae experts disagreed, Zuhud et al. considered it a separate species based on morphological differences in their 1998 book Rafflesia Indonesia: keanekaragaman, ekologi, dan pelestariannya, Jamili Nais following this interpretation in his 2001 book Rafflesia of the World, with Agus Susatya agreeing in 2007. In 2010, molecular studies were published into the genetic variation of the genus Rafflesia; this provided evidence for re-recognition of R. zollingeriana as a distinct species again.

=== Etymology ===
Koorders commemorated the Swiss botanist and mycologist Heinrich Zollinger with the specific epithet; some fifty years previous Zollinger had died from malaria in a southeast Javan village not far from where Koorders discovered his first R. zollingeriana.

== Description ==
Rafflesia species lack roots, stems and chlorophyll, and their leaves have been reduced to tiny scales. They are parasitic plants, deriving all their nutrition from their host species, which they invade by growing a mycelium-like net of foreign tissue within the roots or stems. R. zollingeriana likely only invades the roots of a Tetrastigma species, a vine related to grapes. The flower buds directly out of the thicker roots of the vine, emerging from underground. It rises up to 30 cm from the surface of the soil when fully opened. Flowers last five to seven days in situ before wilting.

Rafflesia species can have different female and male flowers, or 'perfect' flowers with both sexes. R. zollingeriana is of the former type. The flowers are only functionally gonochorous: in the female (pistillate) flowers, the stamens are reduced to non-functional staminodes. In this species, the flowers measure 15 to 30 cm (5.9 to 11.8 in) across, sometimes up to 40 cm (16 in). The 'petals', or more correctly the perianth-lobes, are coloured dark red with numerous, small, pale-coloured, wart-like spots, and it is brown-red inside the perianth-tube.

The flowers of Rafflesia have evolved into such bizarre structures, a special terminology is needed to describe them. Characteristics of R. zollingeriana are a single, slightly protruding annulus, and within it the central column or columna is capped with a column-disc with an erect rim on the underside with more than ten stout, conical protuberances (processus), which can grow up to 2 cm (0.8 in) in length. A closed flower bud is usually technically called a 'knop' (kuncup in Indonesian).

=== Similar species ===
On Java, this species can only be confused with the two other Rafflesia species: R. patma, the most common, and R. rochussenii. R. zollingeriana is the only species to occur in the mountains of the southeast of the island, although R. patma does occur on or along the southern coasts. R. rochussenii is the only species on the island in which the elongated warts ('ramenta') on the inside surface of the perianth-tube are shaped as somewhat disc-like knobs on long stalks. In R. patma these ramenta are reduced or even somewhat absent, but in R. zollingeriana the tube is densely covered in warts ending in acute points, and some of the ramenta can be branched. The pale colour of living R. patma flowers is also distinctive, R. zollingeriana has flowers of a darker reddish-brown, a more common colour among Rafflesia in general. This characteristic is often not clear in preserved herbarium specimens.

== Distribution ==
It is only known from flowering individual plants seen at a number of locations in southeastern Java, until 2017 all of them in the Jember Regency. The first place it was collected was in 1902 at the forestry research station (boschproefstation) at low elevations on the eastern flanks of a hill called Puger Watangan, not far from the beach (Pantai Puger) near the village of Puger. It had perhaps also been seen on neighbouring Mount Sadeng in Jember Regency in the 1910s, but was thereafter not seen for many decades, until a flowering plant was discovered in Meru Betiri National Park, also in the Jember Regency, but somewhat further down the coast to the east, and stretching to Banyuwangi Regency. The Indonesian experts Zuhud and Hikmat rediscovered the species here in 1987. Interviews with locals living around the park has uncovered many more localities, including one outside the park's borders. As of 2012, the species is now known to occur at at least 25 different localities throughout the park, distributed primarily along the coast and the main river, but in a few occasions more inland.

In 2017, Indonesian nature enthusiasts, accompanied by two Indonesian Rafflesia experts, found numerous knops and flowers near Tempursari in neighbouring Lumajang Regency, expanding the distribution to the west. Spending the day exploring the forests in the mountain (Lereng Gunung) towering above the village of Tempursari, the party discovered flowers in the protected areas of KRPH Tempursari and BKPH Pronojiwo KPH Probolinggo.

In 2018, a plant was rediscovered after 116 years only five kilometres from the original type locality at Resort Pemangkuan Hutan Puger, a local-level forestry reserve administered by the village. It was an accidental discovery, researchers were actually at the site to monitor banteng, and saw the flower as they came to retrieve their camera-trap.

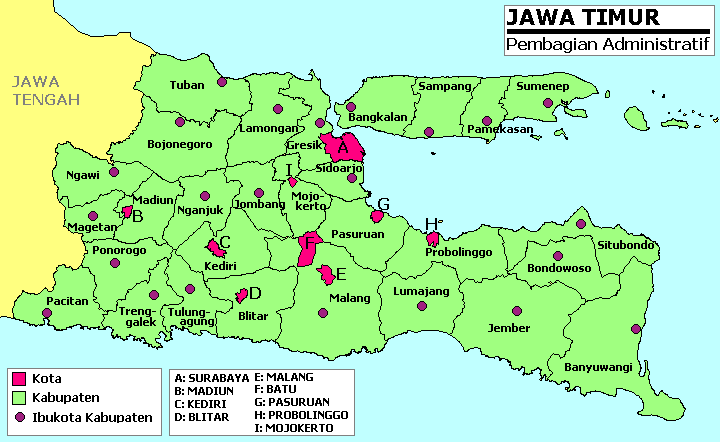
East Java province

There is an old Dutch report from long ago of the presence of a Rafflesia on the island of Bali, just east of East Java (see Meijer, 1997), this would likely be R. zollingeriana, but no one knows, and if Rafflesia ever did exist there, they are probably now extirpated.

The spatial distribution of the species is structured in clusters, with flowers and knop appearing over an area of some 10,000 m^{2}, with the occurrence within these areas being very uneven.

== Ecology ==
It is known from below 400 m (1,300 ft) in altitude, where it is found in dry, lowland forests growing on limestone. In Meru Betiri NP there are two habitats where R. zollingeriana occurs, rocky areas along the coast and flat areas at an altitude of 300 meters above sea level, or 270 meters. Like other species of Rafflesia, it most likely grows in both secondary forests, which grow after human disturbance or natural disasters such as floods or tsunamis, as well as primary forest.

This is an area affected by monsoons with a rainy season from November to March and a dry season between April and October. Average annual rainfall is 2,550 to 3,500 mm.

It had been seen flowering in June and in October by Koorders, but more thorough recent research by Indonesian botanists show that, like other Rafflesia, flowering is relatively constant and sites can last for decades, some sites continue to flower after 25 years. It appears that it flowers more often in the dry season, but that flower buds die more often in this season.

The host vines are thought to be Tetrastigma lanceolarium and/or T. papillosum. The dioecious vine roots where it touches the ground, and easily vegetatively propagates in this way. The bark is grooved and is easy to break and tear. The diameters of the stems in infected areas range between 3 and 18 cm, while the diameter of roots with buds breaking out from them is between 0.5 and 7 cm. R. zollingeriana only grows from the roots of its host.

Research in Meru Betiri NP using two sample plots found that the tree pancal kidang (Aglaia variegata) is by far the most dominant species where R. zollingeriana grows. The presence and abundance of other tree species is more dependent on location, but jejerukan (Polyalthia rumphii) and walangan (Pterospermum diversifolium) were present at both areas in some amount, other trees found at both spots, but more rarely, were the trees glintungan (Bischofia javanica) and bantengan (Alstonia scholaris?), the lauriferous trees kenari (Canarium denticulatum) and talesan (Persea odoratissima), the climbing palm rotan manis (Daemonorops melanocaetes) and kembang Jlamprangan (? flower of Jlamprang).

== Uses ==
The buds (knop) were harvested by locals for use in jamu, Javanese herbalism, a situation first reported in the book by Zuhud et al. in 1998. The bud was sliced and dried before use. In the 1980s, traders paid a price of 1500 rupiah per kilogram of a dried bud in the villages, as opposed to 400 rupiah for 1 kg of rice. Buds were then exported to the nearby city of Jember or the main centres of herbalism - Surabaya and Solo. Collectors reported finding 1 to 30 knop in the forest, collecting all the buds they could find. Collectors did not entirely known what it was used for. Traders reported in the 2010s that the business was drying up -demand was softening and thus lowering prices, collection was more difficult due to patrols of forest rangers, and there were few collectors left, thus supply was constricting. Villagers reported they had stopped collecting in 2001, and that buds had run out in the areas around the villages -one needed to trek deeper into the National Park to find them. Also, almost all villagers reported being interested in conservation and the potential economic benefits of tourism. Buds were seen for sale in surrounding villages in 2000.

Rafflesia zollingeriana can have a positive effect on the income of local communities by providing employment as guides for ecotourists. The species could also potentially be propagated, allowing sustainable harvest of traditional products.

== Conservation ==
The original collection locality may be protected within the Indonesian National Park system, in the Puger Watangan Nature Reserve (Cagar Alam Puger Watangan), but this originally consisted of five different territories, and in 1958 the reserve was reduced; only CA Puger Watangan I remains. This conservation area is now run by the non-governmental organisation Balai Besar Konservasi Sumber Daya Alam Jawa Timur. It is also found in Meru Betiri National Park. Meru Betiri NP has a budget for monitoring the population of an eagle, Spizaetus bartelsi, and wild banteng, but not anything else. Ranger patrols regularly visit known budding sites, but do no active exploration for new ones -locals from surrounding villages indicated a number of sites unknown to science, when interviewed.

The population was highly impacted by the 1994 tsunami which caused major habitat destruction throughout the region, wiping out 60% of the known population at the time in Meru Betiri NP.

Other threats to this species are thought to be collection for herbalism (albeit largely stopped), and cutting down the forests. Meru Betiri NP is restoring forests on their territory. Ecotourism is also a threat. The populations growing on the Lereng Gunung are likely protected from tourists, as the locations here are remote and difficult to access. Many, if not most, of the locations in Meru Betiri NP are also safe from human disturbance. Ecotourism is also beneficial, because it gives local people an economic reason to conserve the plants, instead of harvesting them for herbalism.

This species was first legally protected in Indonesia by Act No. 5/1990, later by regulation PP #7 of 1999, modified in 2018 by PerMenLHK # P.20 /MENLHK/SETJEN/KUM.1/2018.

Wiriadinata, in his contribution on plant species in the 2001 book Spesies-Spesies Hayati yang Dilindungi Perundang-undangan Indonesia, considered this species to be 'rare'. Susatya called it 'critically endangered' in his 2011 book Rafflesia Pesona Bunga Terbesar di Dunia. As of 2013, the World Conservation Monitoring Centre of the United Nations Environment Programme classified the species as 'rare' in their UNEP-WCMC Species Database, but in the new Species+ database which has replaced this database, the entries on Rafflesia species have apparently gone missing.
