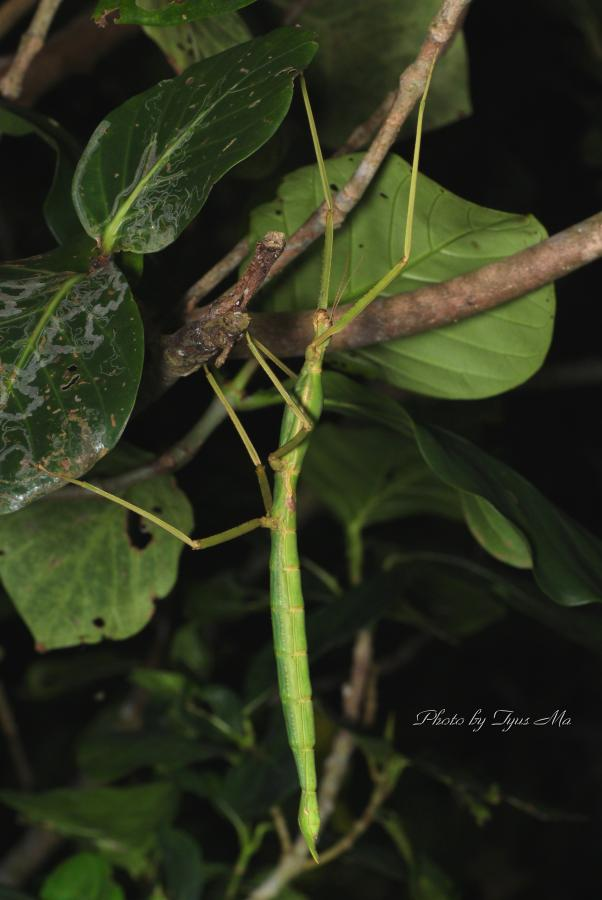

Scientific classification
- Kingdom: Animalia
- Phylum: Arthropoda
- Class: Insecta
- Order: Phasmatodea
- Family: Phasmatidae
- Tribe: Stephanacridini
- Genus: Phasmotaenia
- Species: P. lanyuhensis

Binomial name
- Phasmotaenia lanyuhensis Huang and Brock, 2001
- P. lanyuhensis is only known from Orchid Island, off Taiwan

= Phasmotaenia lanyuhensis =

Species of stick insect

Phasmotaenia lanyuhensis is a species of stick insect, order Phasmatodea. It is endemic to Taiwan. It is often included in the family Phasmatidae, although sometimes excluded from it when the family is strictly delimited. It derives its specific name from its type locality, Lanyu Island, commonly known as Orchid Island.

== Distribution ==
Phasmotaenia lanyuhensis is known from its type locality, Lanyu Island (Taitung County). It is very common on the island. P. lanyuhensis is the most northern Phasmotaenia species, otherwise known from the Philippines, Micronesia, New Guinea, and Fiji.

== Description ==
Phasmotaenia lanyuhensis is similar and closely related to P. sanchezi, the type species of the genus Phasmotaenia from the Philippines, but has a more robust body, relatively shorter mesothorax, larger head, and shorter antennae. Furthermore, female P. lanyuhensis have more prominently swollen mesothorax, shorter alae, and shorter subgenital plate.

P. lanyuhensis was described based on four females and three males, including three mating pairs. Males measure 114–117 mm (4.5–4.6 in) and females 158–162 mm (6.2–6.4 in) in body length. They are slender-bodied insects with tiny or absent fore wings and short hindwings. Coloration varies from pale brown to dark brown to green. The hindwings are black in females and brown in males. The thorax is broadened in females and elongate in males. The legs are long and slender and bear numerous small serrations; the femora may have four dark brown bands in females. The head is smooth and much longer than it is wide. The eyes are small. The antennae are brown and have 23 segments.

The egg capsule is 4 mm (0.2 in) long.

== Habitat ==
This species is very common on Orchid Island where they primarily occur in the forested areas, hanging underneath branches in the daytime. Their food plant is Bischofia javanica (although in captivity they readily accept Turpinia formosana). They roam around their food plant about an hour before sunrise, mostly no higher than about ten meters above the ground.
