= Meru Betiri National Park =

National park of Indonesia

- Taman Nasional Meru Betiri
- IUCN category II (national park)
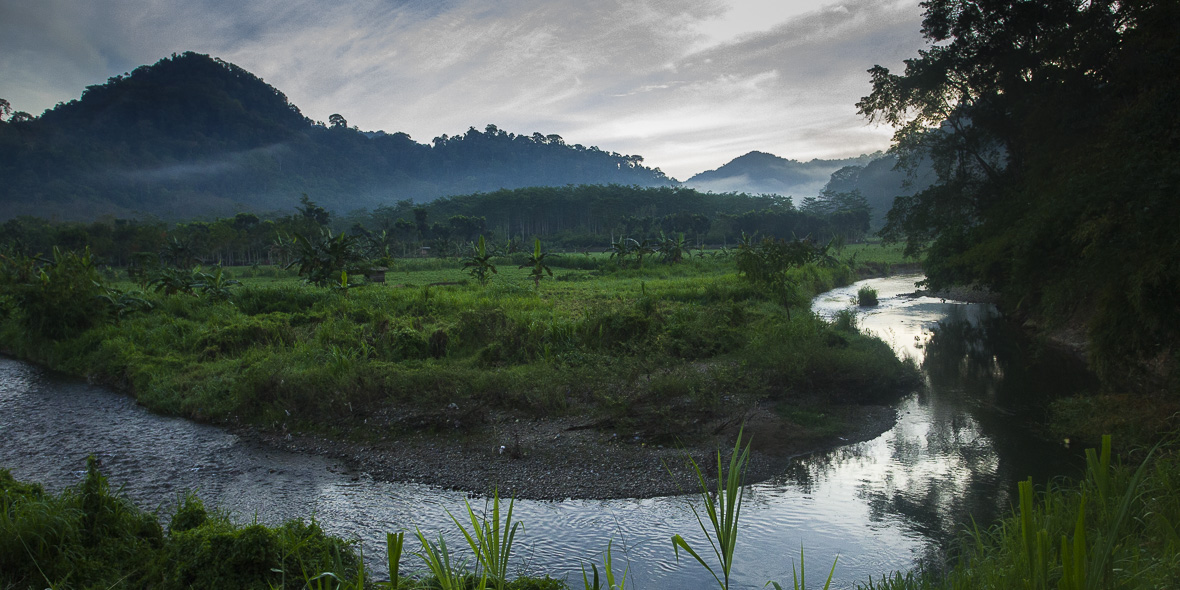

- Location within Java Location within Indonesia
- Location: East Java, Indonesia
- Nearest city: Jember
- Coordinates: 8°32′S 113°47′E
- Area: 580 km^{2} (220 sq mi)
- Established: 1982
- Visitors: 2,486 (in 2006)
- Governing body: Ministry of Environment and Forestry

Meru Betiri National Park is a national park in the province of East Java, Indonesia, extending over an area of 580 km^{2} (220 sq mi) of which a small part of 8.45 km^{2} (3.26 sq mi) is marine. The beaches of the park provide nesting grounds for endangered turtle species such as the leatherback sea turtle, hawksbill sea turtle, green sea turtle and olive ridley sea turtle.

== Geography and climate ==
Meru Betiri National Park has a varied topography reaching from a plain coast to highlands with an altitude of almost 1,200 metres (3,900 ft). The tallest mountains within the park are Mount Gamping (538 m), Mount Butak (609 m), Mount Sukamade Atas (801 m), Mount Gendong (840 m asl), Mount Mandilis (844 m) and Mount Betiri (1,192 m). The topography along the coast is generally hilly to mountainous. There are only a few sandy plain coasts, most of them located in the west, such as Rajegwesi Beach, Sukamade Beach, Permisan Beach, Meru Beach, and Bandealit Beach. Some rivers across Meru Betiri NP are the Sukamade River, a perennial river, the Permisan River, the Meru River, and the Sekar Pisang River which flows to the South coast.

The Meru Betiri area is influenced by monsoon wind. From November to March, the westerly wind brings rainfall to the area, whereas the dry season occurs from April to October. The average annual rainfall is between 2300 and 4,000 millimetres (160 in), with 4 dry months and 7 wet months on average.

== Vegetation ==
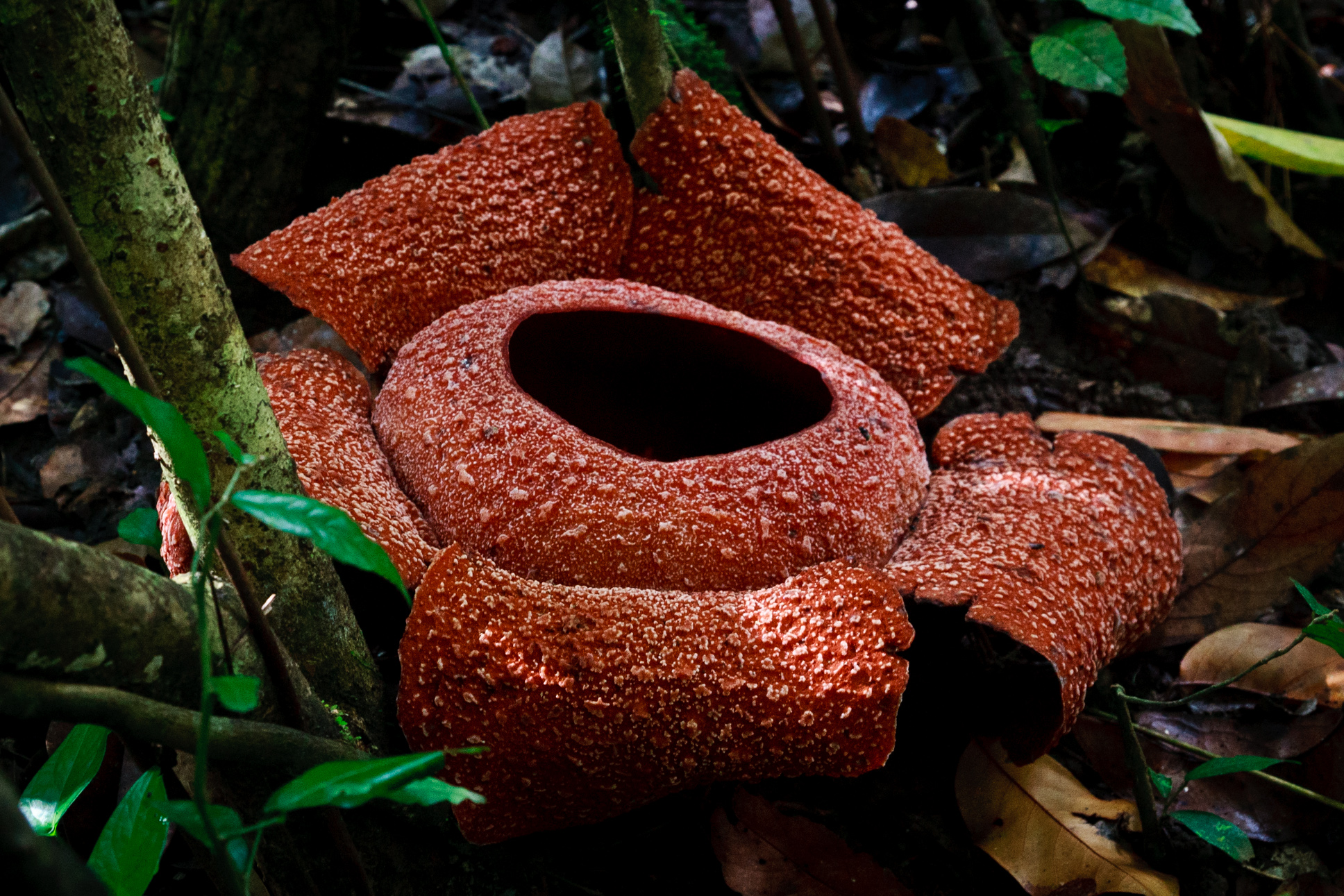
Rafflesia zollingeriana found at Krecek Block, National Park Management Section Region II Ambulu, Meru Betiri National Park

As a result of its diverse topography, Meru Betiri NP contains five distinct vegetation types:

- Coastal vegetation is found around Sukamade Bay and Meru Bay. This vegetation includes the Barringtonia asiatica, Calophyllum inophyllum, Hibiscus tiliaceus, Terminalia catappa, and Pandanus tectorius.
- Mangrove vegetation is found on the eastern side of Rajegwesi Bay as the outlet of Lembu and Karang Tambak Rivers, Meru Bay, and Sukamade Coast. The dominant vegetations are Rhizophora, Avicennia, and Bruguiera. At the outlet of the Sukamade River, there is Nypa fruticans.
- Swamp vegetation is found at the back of the mangrove forest of Sukamade. Some tree species here are Manilkara kauki, Gluta renghas, Alstonia scholaris, and Sterculia foetida.
- Lowland tropical rain forest, including among others tree species of Pterospermum, Tetrameles nudiflora, Ficus variegata, Diospyros cauliflora, Aglaia variegata, Dracontomelon mangiferum, Bischofia javanica, Dysoxylum gaudichaudianum, Pseudobombax septenatum, Litsea, and Plectocomia elongata.
- Rheophytic vegetation is found in the wetland areas, such as at the Sukamade area. The dominant vegetation species here is the Saccharum spontaneum.

The rare parasitic plant Rafflesia zollingeriana was rediscovered in Meru Betiri NP.

== Fauna ==
The park provides habitat for many other protected animals, including 29 species of mammal and 180 species of bird. Among them are the banteng, Javan leopard, wild boar, long-tailed macaque, Sumatran dhole, Javanese flying squirrel, leopard cat, Javan muntjac, and green peafowl. The beaches of the park provide a nesting ground for leatherback turtles, hawksbill turtles, green turtles, and olive ridley turtles.

Meru Betiri National Park is known as the last habitat of the Javan tiger (Panthera tigris sondaica) which is now considered extinct, with the last sighting having been recorded in 1976. Due to research in 1997, tiger paw prints at a size of 26–28 centimetres (10–11 in) were found, so the Forestry Ministry agreed to monitor the existence of the Javanese tiger with a camera trap in 2011.

== Conservation ==
The Meru Betiri Forest area was first appointed as a protected forest by the Dutch Colonial Government in 1931. In 1972 the Meru Betiri Protected Forest (500 km^{2}) was appointed as a wildlife sanctuary, prioritized for protecting the habitat of the then endangered Javan tiger. In 1982 the sanctuary was expanded to its current extent of 580 km^{2} including a marine area of 845 ha. In 1982 the sanctuary was declared a National Park, which finally was designated as such in 1997.

== See also ==
- Sanen River
- Mayang River
- Mayang basin
