= Hermarchus leytensis =

Scientific classification
- Domain: Eukaryota
- Kingdom: Animalia
- Phylum: Arthropoda
- Class: Insecta
- Order: Phasmatodea
- Family: Phasmatidae
- Subfamily: Platycraninae
- Tribe: Stephanacridini
- Genus: Hermarchus
- Species: H. leytensis

Binomial name
- Hermarchus leytensis Zompro, 1997

Species of stick insect

Hermarchus leytensis is a species of stick insect in the order Phasmatodea. It is endemic to the Philippines.

== Description ==
Hermarchus leytensis exhibit sexual dimorphism. Adult females are bulky and typically have a body length of 130-150mm. They are a bright green in color. Males are thin, winged, and are about 95mm in length.

== Distribution ==
This species occurs in the Philippines, with known records from Leyte Island.
