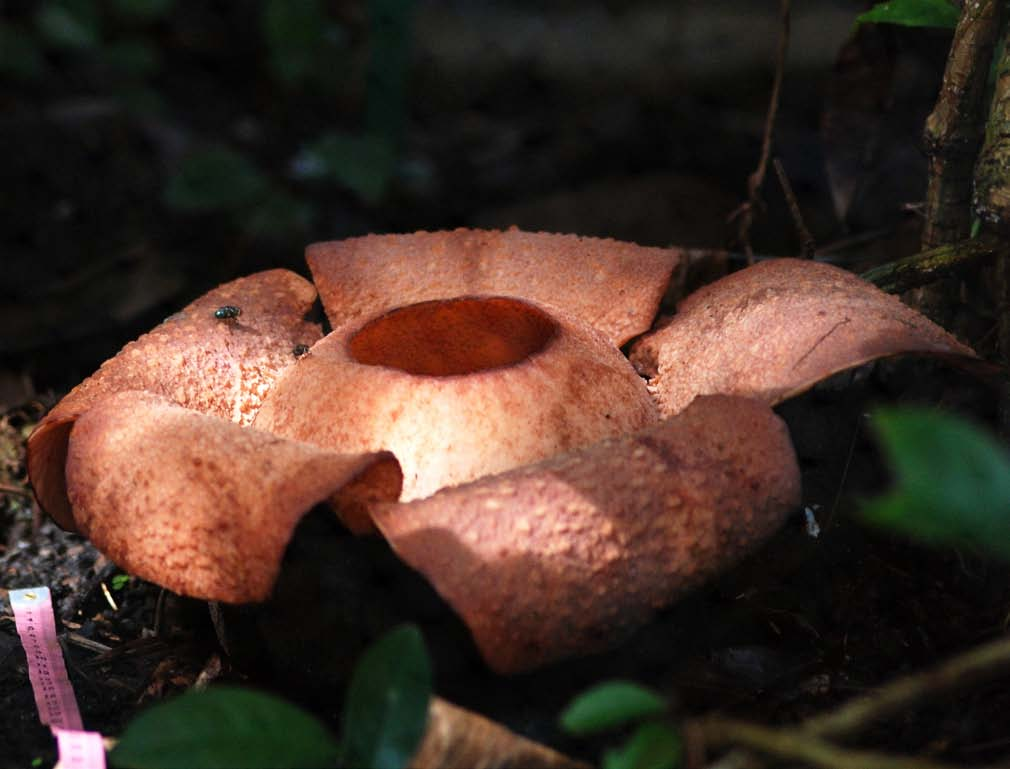
- Cultivated ex situ at the Bogor Botanical Gardens

Scientific classification
- Kingdom: Plantae
- Clade: Embryophytes
- Clade: Tracheophytes
- Clade: Angiosperms
- Clade: Eudicots
- Clade: Rosids
- Order: Malpighiales
- Family: Rafflesiaceae
- Genus: Rafflesia
- Species: R. patma

Binomial name
- Rafflesia patma Blume

Synonyms
- See text

= Rafflesia patma =

Species of flowering plant

Rafflesia patma is a parasitic plant species of the genus Rafflesia. It is only known to grow on the Indonesian island of Java, although it may have occurred on Sumatra in the past (and may still occur there). Like other species in its genus, this plant has no leaves, stems, roots or chlorophyll, instead stealing all its nutrition from Tetrastigma leucostaphylum, a rainforest liana.

The anatomy of this plant has devolved into mycelium-like strands of cells infecting the internal vascular system of its host. The species' five-lobed flowers measure 30 to 60 cm across, and stink with the odour of rotting flesh. This stench attracts mostly female carrion flies searching for a place to lay their eggs. When they fly inside the large pot-like structure in the middle of the flower, they find a central column inside, topped with a wart-covered disc-like plate; under the rim of this plate they find a small crevice, into which they crawl believing they have found an opening into the soft parts of a rotting body—instead, the rim is shaped in such a way that, when investigating, their backs are thus smeared with the jelly-like pollen if the Rafflesia flower is male, or it is pressed against a zone of modified stigmas if the flower is female.

== Taxonomy ==
Rafflesia patma was first collected in 1824 from the then still completely forested Indonesian island of Kembangan, located off the Indian Ocean coast of Java. According to Willem Meijer it was found by an unknown collector sent by the then young man Carl Ludwig Blume, then director of the Bogor Botanical Gardens as well as a number of other colonial government positions, who was using his personal wealth garnered from his first wife to send collectors throughout Java. Kees van Steenis, on the other hand, states it was Blume himself who did all of his collecting, and likely analysed his specimens and wrote the descriptions in situ in preparation for publication.

Blume then used this collection to formally describe the plant as a new species in 1825, including it in the strange new genus Rafflesia, which had only been described a few years earlier. Blume apparently only had six works on taxonomy with him in Java to identify plants at the time, including the 1820 work by William Jack in the British Sumatra colony, which included the first published scientific description of a Rafflesia, Rafflesia titan.

=== Etymology ===
The specific epithet is derived from patma, the Javanese vernacular name of the plant. That name itself originates etymologically from the word पद्म (padma), Sanskrit for 'lotus'.

=== Synonymy ===
The wider world of Western science was first introduced to the giant flowers of Rafflesia in a classic article by Robert Brown in the Transactions of the Linnean Society, published in 1821, but read before the Society in 1820, and distributed throughout Western Europe in pre-print. In this reading and publication Brown introduced the name R. horsfieldii for a plant from Java. No holotype exists, Brown never saw an actual plant: a drawing was made of the plant in Java by the American naturalist Thomas Horsfield which was sent to England, but this has been lost for a very long time. Brown originally described a plant which had flowers 3 inches across. In his later publication on the genus Rafflesia, published in 1840 (finally, a decade after the paper was read before the Society), Brown changed the description to state that the radius was 3 inches, and the flower thus 6 inches across.

The authors of the 1963 (English version of the) Flora of Java offered the theory that Brown had been confused with Rhizanthes zippelii, and proposed to synonymise the name Rafflesia horsfieldii with that taxon, but this theory was later rejected by Willem Meijer in 1988, the Rafflesia expert at the time, on the basis of the flowers being too small, and because Brown described the plant as otherwise similar in form to R. arnoldii, with processus on the columna – while Rhizanthes quite obviously have many more perianth-lobes than the five of Rafflesia, making this unlikely to be overlooked by Brown. No Rhizanthes species is known with such relatively small flowers. There are a few Rafflesia species with flowers down to 5 inches across, but these occur in the Philippines, far from Java.

In 1999, David Mabberley, writing a work on the place of Brown in the history of botany, stated that Meijer had "inexplicably" ignored the name during his work revising the taxonomy of the Rafflesiaceae in the 1990s. Mabberley was apparently himself ignorant of the preceding synonymy with Rhizanthes, and did not consult the relevant works, and as such synonymised the species with the largest flowers on Java, R. patma, with R. horsfieldii, with the simple explanation of "Brown's remarks". In fact, Meijer had stated that on the basis of Brown's remarks, and without the drawing, it may be impossible to ever know what Brown was referring to. Nevertheless, as of October 2020, databases such as Plants of the World Online have indexed Mabberley's taxonomic interpretation, although R. patma is accepted as the correct name for the extant taxon by other sources.

In 1997 Meijer made the very rarely seen R. zollingeriana a synonym of R. patma, but molecular studies published 2010 into the genetic variation of the genus found that R. zollingeriana was distinct.

== Description ==
This species is gonochorous. The flowers measure 30 to 60 cm across, and stink with the odour of rotting flesh. The buds, often called 'knops' by Indonesian researchers, bud out of the roots of the host vine, or the bases of the stems. In some cases a large number of buds in different stages of development can appear.

=== Similar species ===
Rafflesia patma shares Java with two other species of Rafflesia: R. zollingeriana, the most common, and R. rochussenii. R. zollingeriana only occurs inland in the mountains of the southeast of the island, although R. patma does occur on or along the southern coasts. R. rochussenii is the only species on the island in which the tiny stalked warts (ramenta) on the inside surface of the perianth-tube are shaped somewhat like disc-like knobs on long stalks. In R. patma these warts are reduced or even somewhat absent, but in R. zollingeriana the tube is densely covered in ramenta ending in acute points, and some of the ramenta can be branched. The pale colour of R. patma flowers is also a distinctive characteristic.

== Distribution ==
This plant perhaps only occurs on the island of Java in Indonesia. It is thought to also have occurred in southern Sumatra, but overharvesting of the flowers may have caused it to become extirpated from this island.

== Ecology ==
Rafflesia patma is a holoparasite of Tetrastigma leucostaphylum, a rainforest liana in the Vitaceae, the botanical family that includes the grape vine.

== Conservation ==
A population is protected within Pananjung Pangandaran Nature Reserve.
