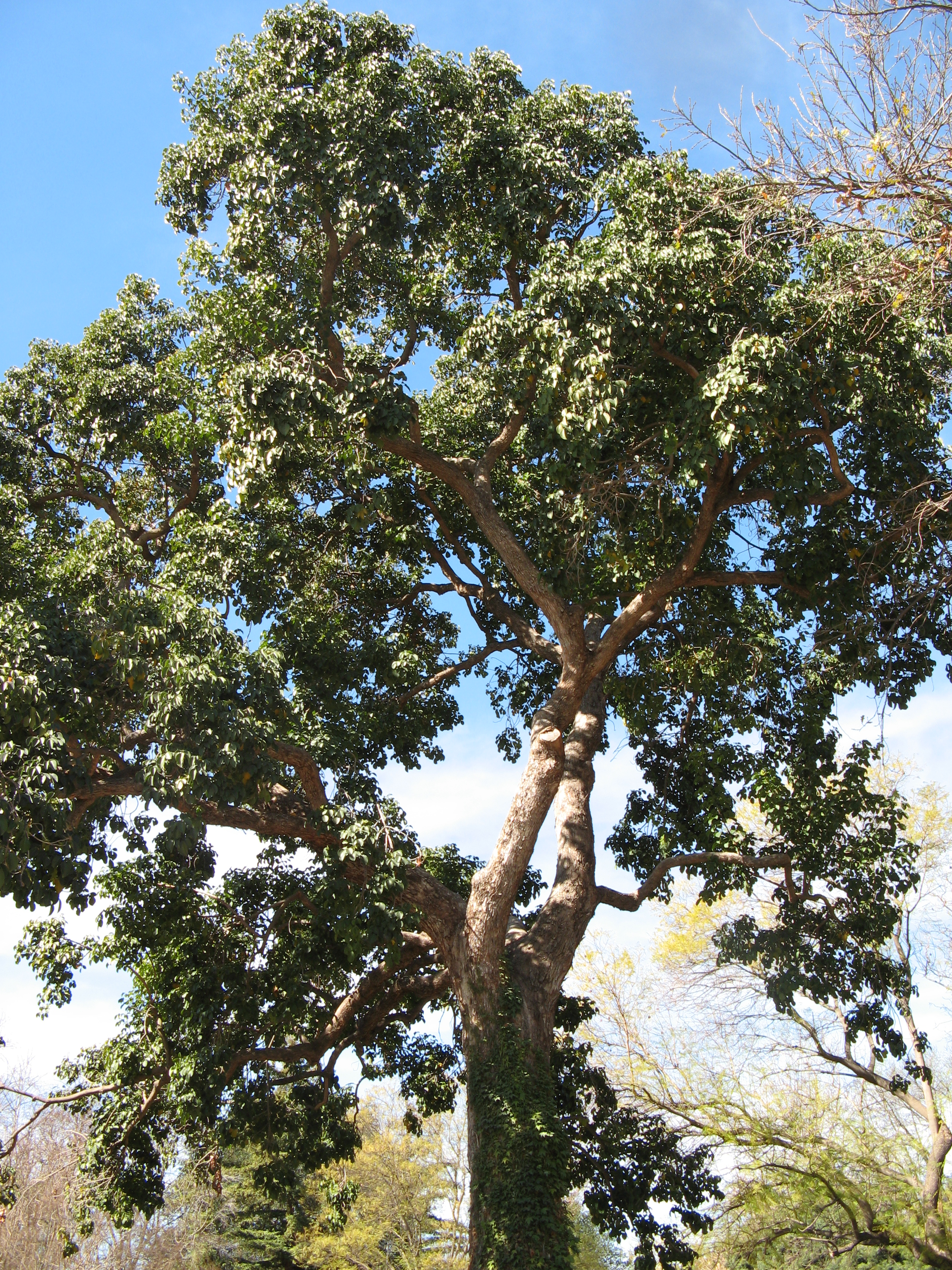
- Bischofia javanica

Scientific classification
- Kingdom: Plantae
- Clade: Tracheophytes
- Clade: Angiosperms
- Clade: Eudicots
- Clade: Rosids
- Order: Malpighiales
- Family: Phyllanthaceae
- Subfamily: Antidesmatoideae
- Tribe: Bischofieae
- Genus: Bischofia; Blume

Synonyms
- Microelus Wight & Arn.; Stylodiscus Benn.

= Bischofia =

Genus of flowering plants

Bischofia is a genus of plants in the family Phyllanthaceae first described as a genus in 1827. It is native to southern China, the Indian subcontinent, Queensland, New Guinea, and various islands of the Pacific. It is the only member of the tribe Bischofieae. They are dioecious, with male and female flowers on separate plants, but may rarely be monoecious.

The genus Bischofia was named after Gottleib Wilhelm T. G. Bischoff, 1797–1854, German botanist, by Karl Blume.

species

1. Bischofia javanica Blume - S China, Taiwan, Ryukyu Is, Himalayas, India, Bangladesh, Assam, Andaman & Nicobar, Indochina, Malaysia, Indonesia, Philippines, Papuasia, Queensland, Fiji, Niue, Samoa, Tonga, Vanuatu, Cook Is, Society Is
2. Bischofia polycarpa (H.Lév.) Airy Shaw - China (Anhui, Fujian, Guangdong, Guangxi, Guizhou, Hunan, Jiangsu, Jiangxi, Shaanxi, Yunnan, Zhejiang)
