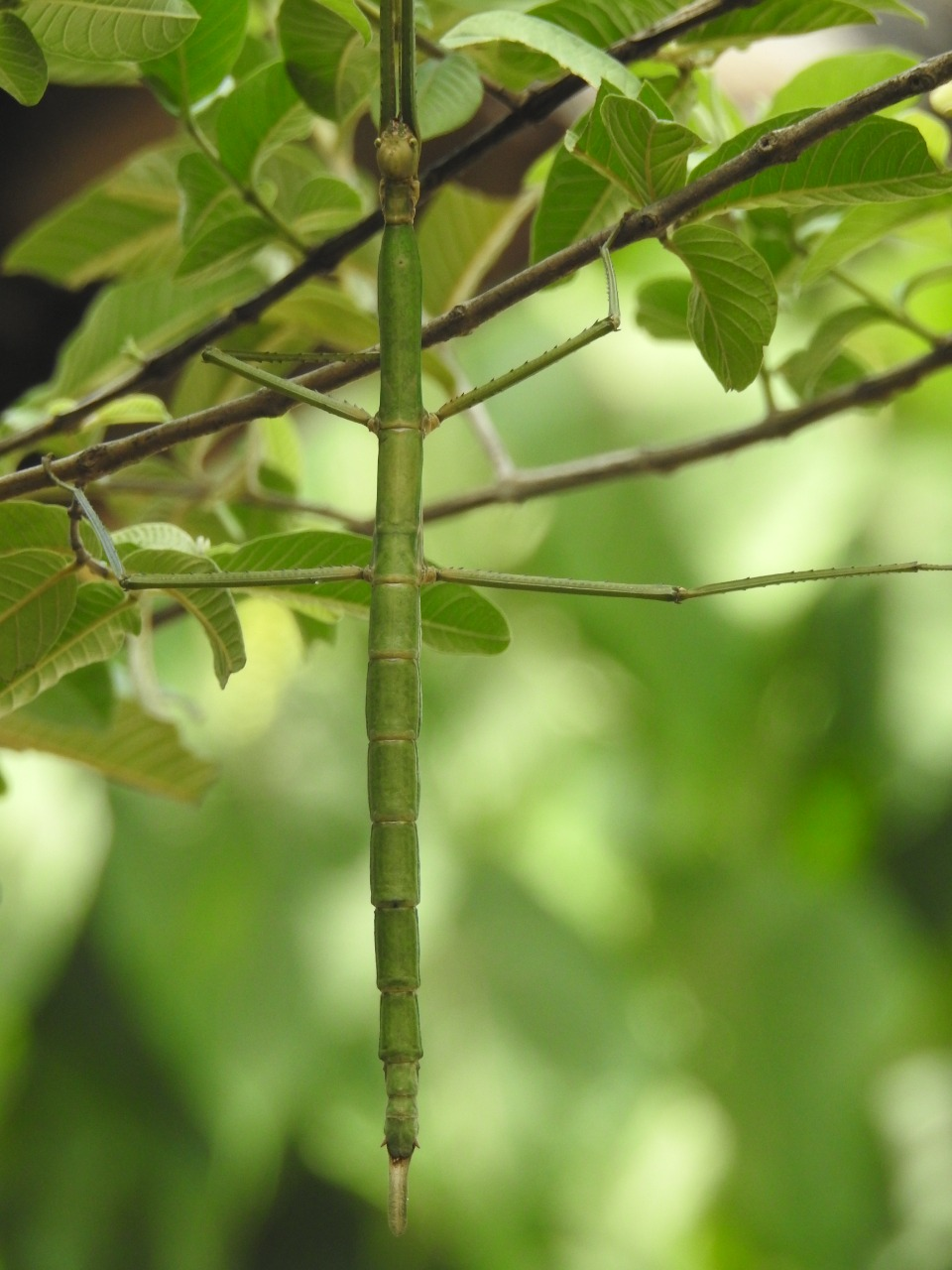

Scientific classification
- Domain: Eukaryota
- Kingdom: Animalia
- Phylum: Arthropoda
- Class: Insecta
- Order: Phasmatodea
- Family: Phasmatidae
- Genus: Nesiophasma
- Species: N. sobesonbaii

Binomial name
- Nesiophasma sobesonbaii Hennemann, Cumming, Damastra, Damaledo & Le Tirant, 2023

= Nesiophasma sobesonbaii =

Species of insect

Nesiophasma sobesonbaii is a species of stick insect.

== Etymology ==
The specific epithet sobesonbaii is given in honour of king Sobe Sonbai III from Timor island.

== Distribution ==
This species is found on Timor island.
