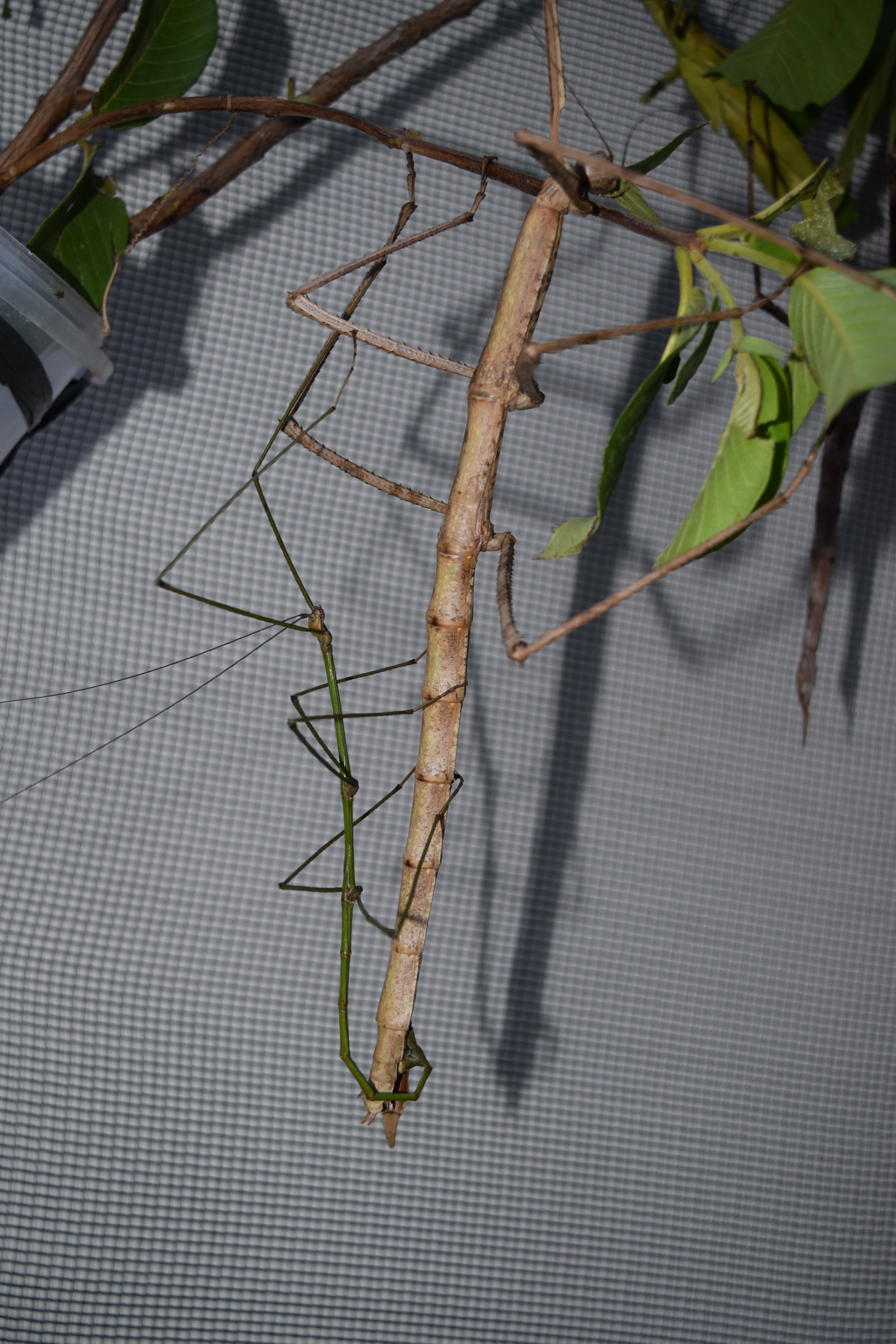
- Nesiophasma giganteum mating, photographed by Hari Purwanto

Scientific classification
- Kingdom: Animalia
- Phylum: Arthropoda
- Clade: Pancrustacea
- Class: Insecta
- Order: Phasmatodea
- Family: Phasmatidae
- Genus: Nesiophasma
- Species: N. giganteum

Binomial name
- Nesiophasma giganteum Hennemann, Le Tirant & Purwanto, 2021

= Nesiophasma giganteum =

Species of stick insect

Nesiophasma giganteum is a species of stick insect, order Phasmatodea. It was formally described in 2021 and is endemic to Peleng. Adult females are large, typically measuring 250–300mm (10–12 inches) in body length. Both sexes are wingless.

== Gallery ==
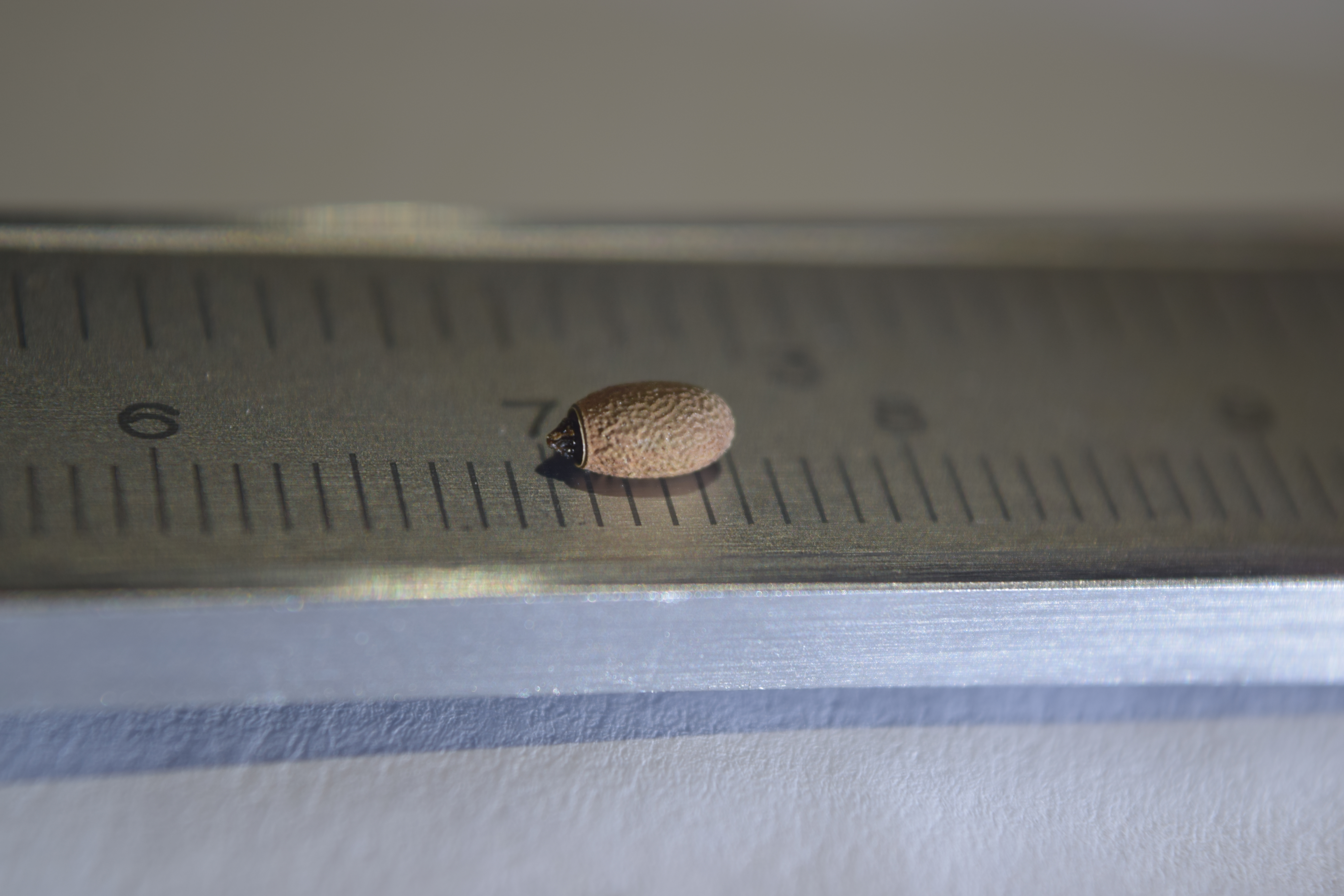
Nesiophasma giganteum ova

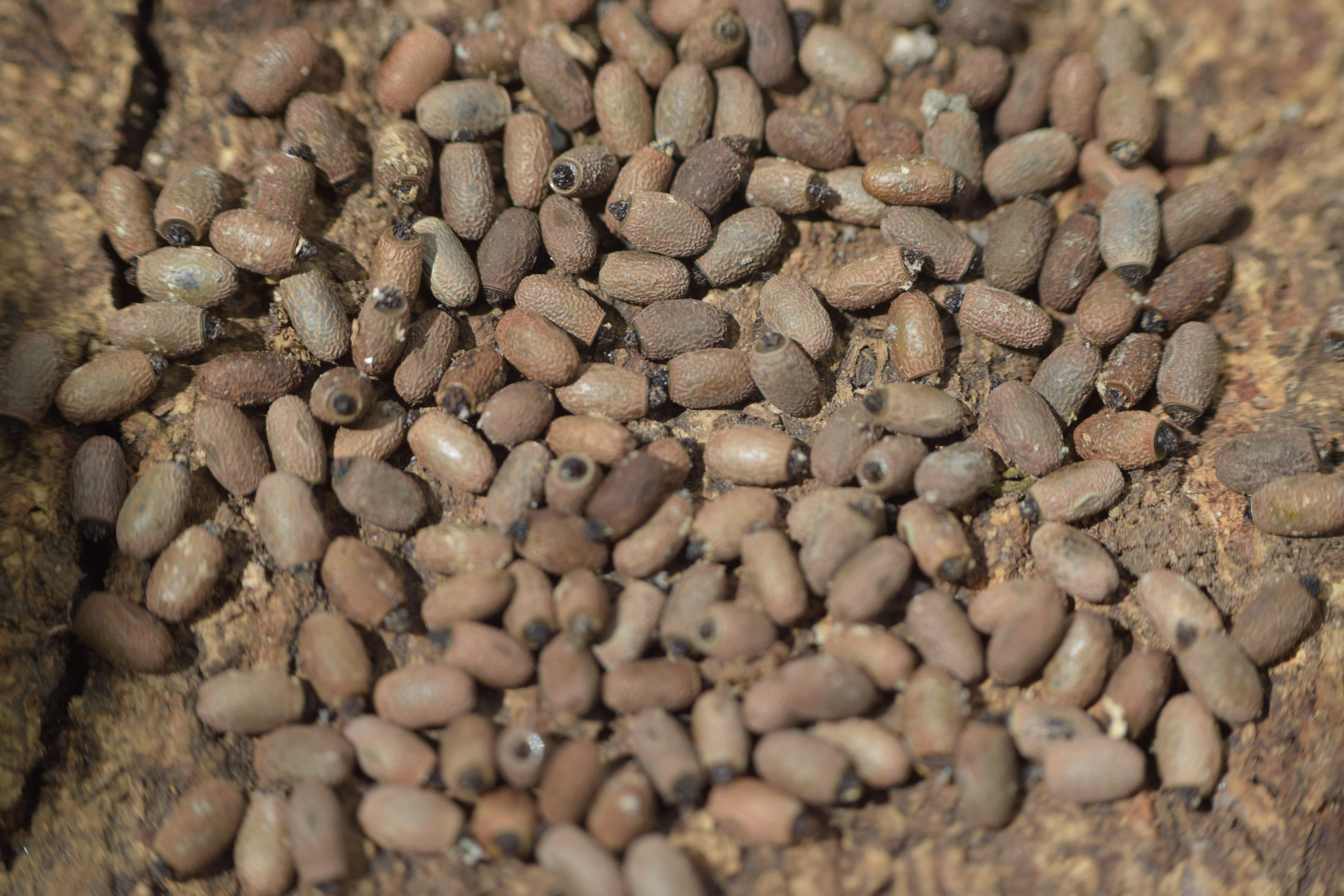
Nesiophasma giganteum eggs

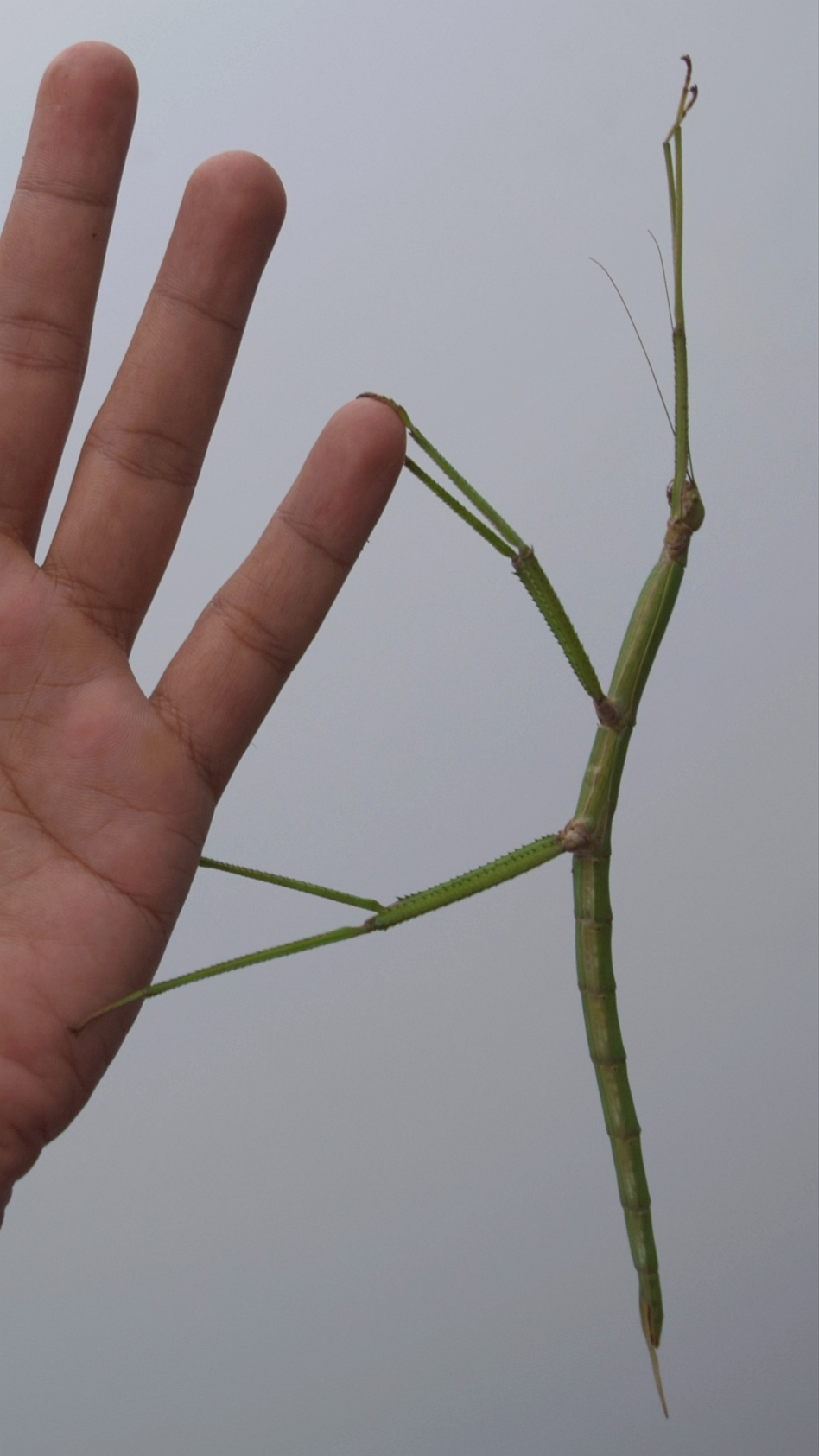
Nesiophasma giganteum nymph

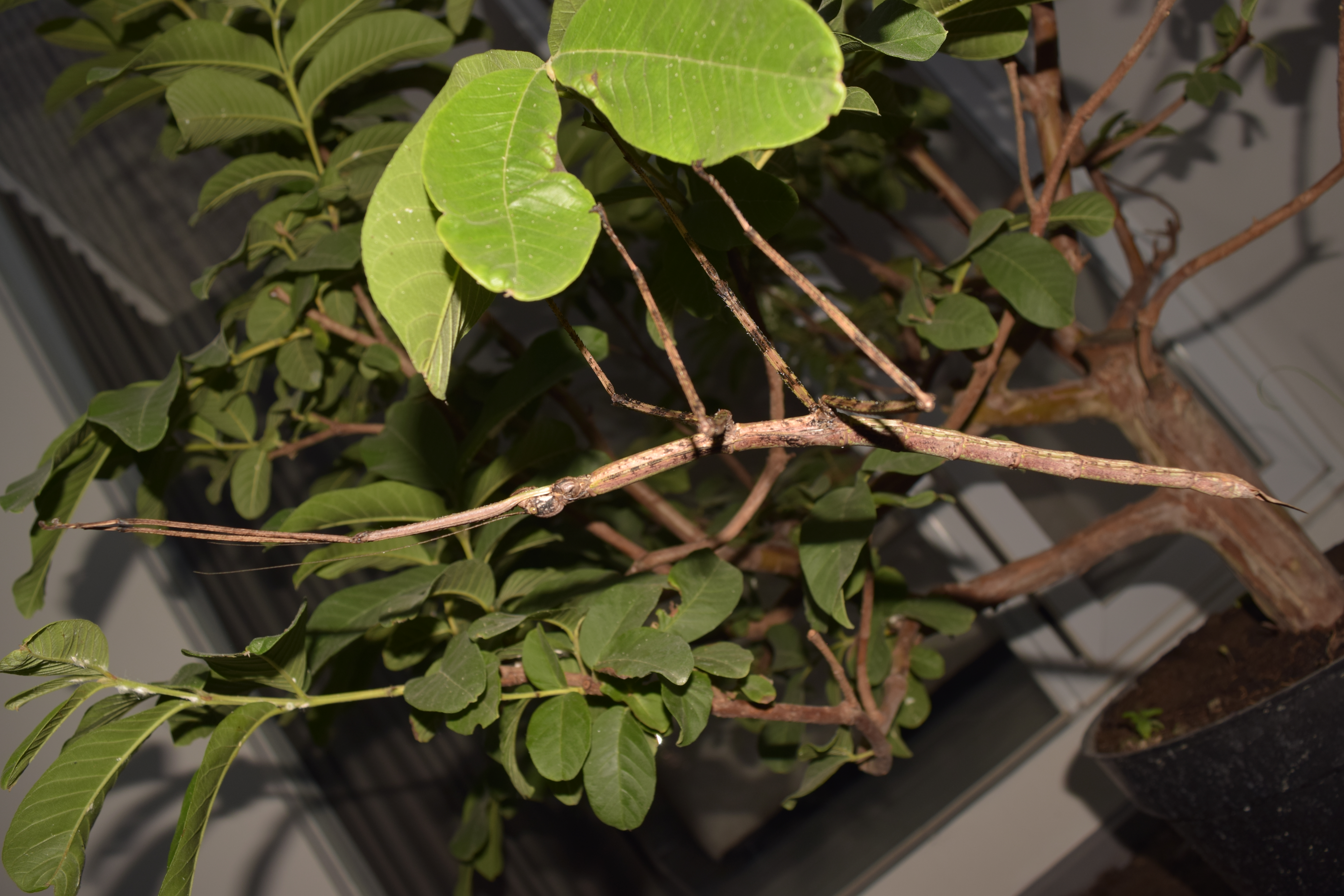
Nesiophasma giganteum female

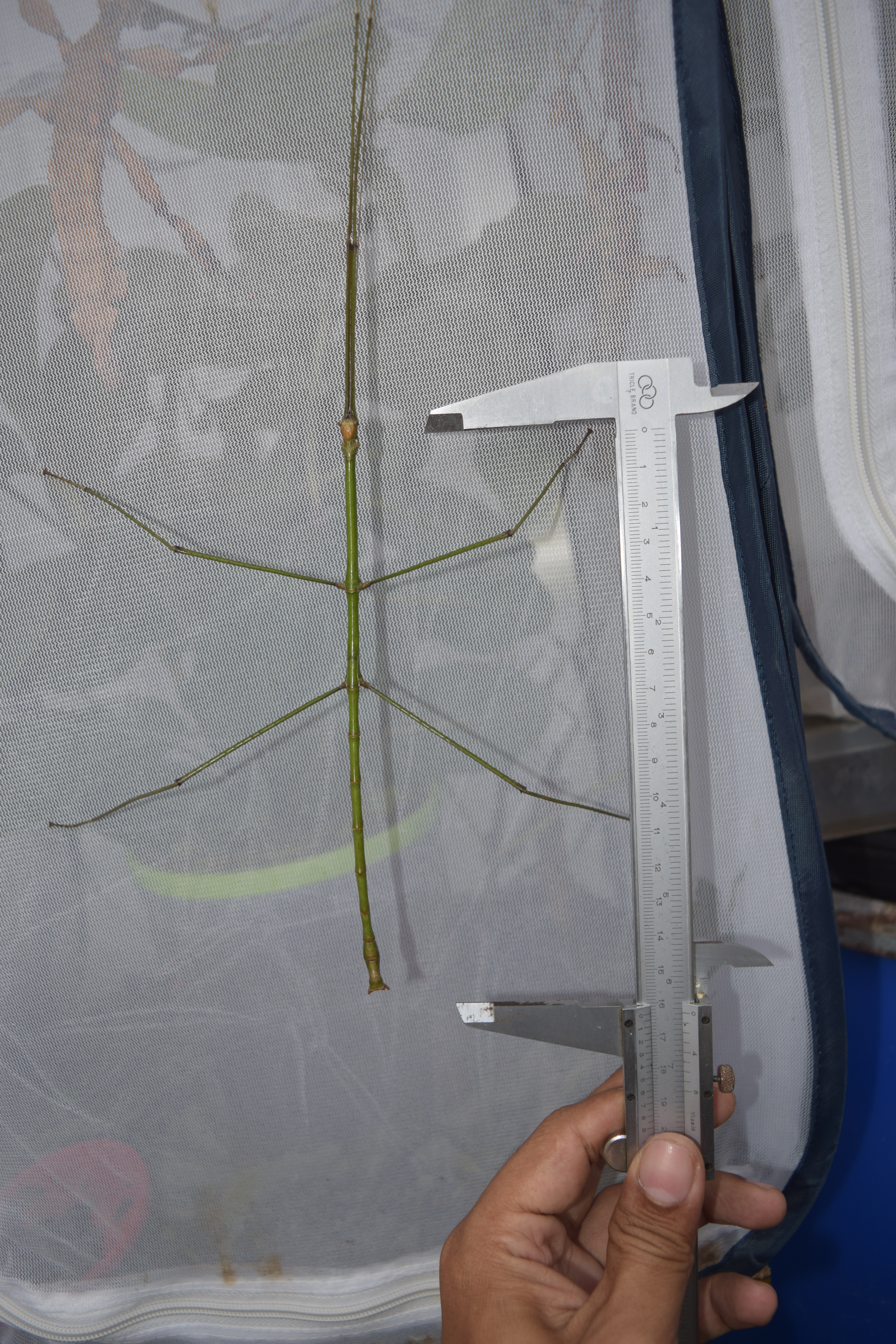
Nesiophasma giganteum male
