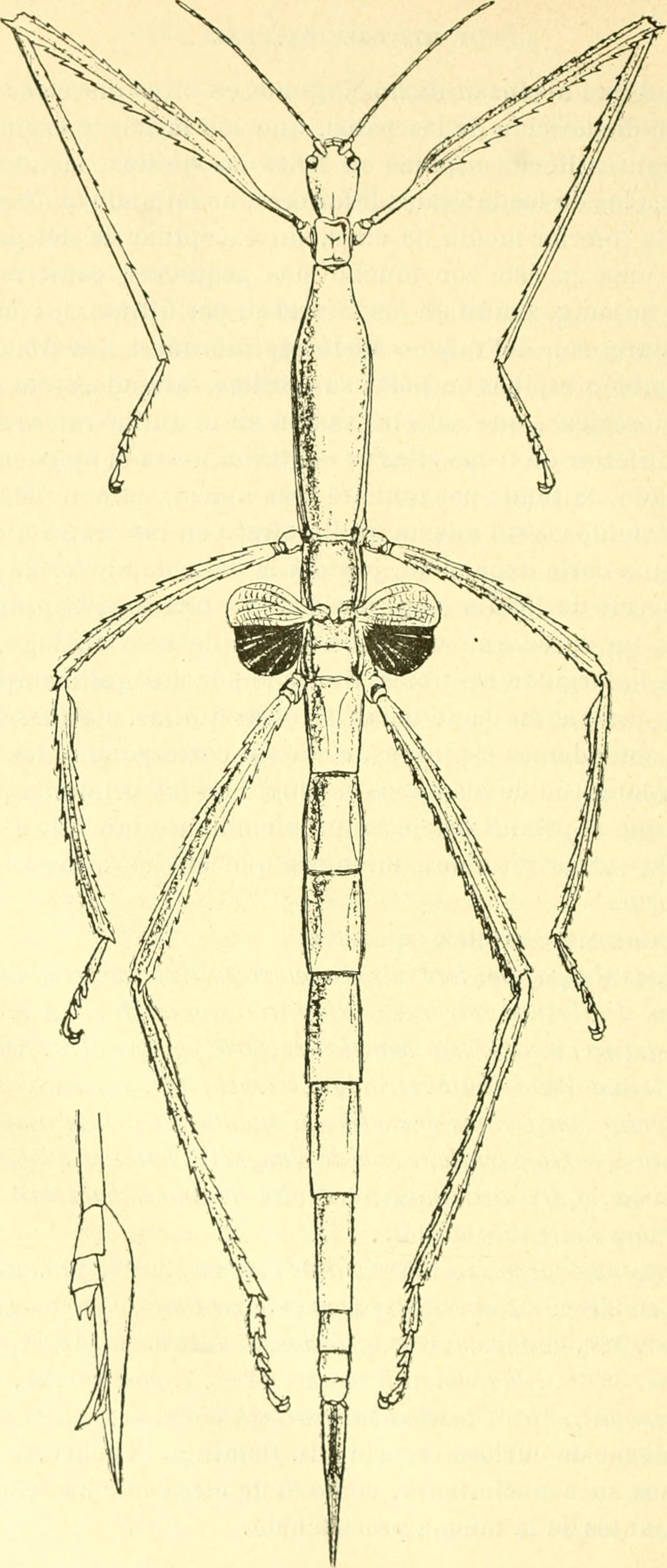
- Anales de la Sociedad Española de Historia Natural (1897) (18140372486)

Scientific classification
- Domain: Eukaryota
- Kingdom: Animalia
- Phylum: Arthropoda
- Class: Insecta
- Order: Phasmatodea
- Family: Phasmatidae
- Tribe: Stephanacridini
- Genus: Phasmotaenia; Navas, 1907

= Phasmotaenia =

Genus of insects

Phasmotaenia is a genus of phasmids belonging to the family Phasmatidae.

The species of this genus are found in Southeastern Asia.

Species:

- Phasmotaenia australe Günther, 1933
- Phasmotaenia bukaense Hennemann & Conle, 2009
- Phasmotaenia godeffroyi (Redtenbacher, 1908)
- Phasmotaenia guentheri Hennemann & Conle, 2009
- Phasmotaenia inermis (Redtenbacher, 1908)
- Phasmotaenia laeviceps (Hennemann & Conle, 2006)
- Phasmotaenia lanyuhensis Huang & Brock, 2001
- Phasmotaenia salomonense Hennemann & Conle, 2009
- Phasmotaenia sanchezi (Bolívar, 1897)
- Phasmotaenia spinosa Cliquennois & Brock, 2004
- Phasmotaenia spinosa Hennemann & Conle, 2009
- Phasmotaenia virgea Hennemann & Conle, 2009
