= Pananjung Pangandaran Nature Reserve =

- Cagar Alam Pananjung Pangandaran
- IUCN category Ia (strict nature reserve)
- Interactive map of Pananjung Pangandaran Nature Reserve
- Location: Pananjung Peninsula, Pangandaran Regency, West Java, Indonesia
- Nearest city: Pangandaran; Parigi (seat of government); Cilacap (city)
- Coordinates: 7°42′18.825″S 108°39′33.554″E
- Area: 454.616 ha (1,123.38 acres)
- Established: 1934
- Governing body: Ministry of Environment (Indonesia)

Pananjung Pangandaran Nature Reserve (Indonesian: Cagar Alam Pananjung Pangandaran) is a nature reserve covering the Pananjung Peninsula and surrounding sea areas in Pangandaran, Pangandaran Regency, West Java, Indonesia. The complex is divided into two types of conservation area, a nature park (Taman Wisata Alam) and a nature reserve (Cagar Alam).

It occupies two thirds of the "Pananjung", a small peninsula located at the southeastern part of Pangandaran Regency, including the surrounding marine protected areas. It is also adjacent to the neighboring Pangandaran Nature Park. Since 2010, the designated area for the nature reserve is 454 hectares of land and 470 hectares of marine area.

== History ==
Initially, during the Dutch colonial period, it was intended to serve as game reserve by then-resident of Priangan, Johan Eijken in 1922. Before that, the area was considered an open land. In 1934, the area's status was updated to a wildlife sanctuary (Wildreservaat Penandjoeng) based on Governor-General's Decree No. 19 Official Gazette 669 with a total area of 457 hectares. The status was then upgraded again in 1961 to a nature reserve after the discovery of a Rafflesia flower at the site.

In 1971, around 37.7 hectares of land from the reserve was repurposed as a nature park. An additional 470 hectares of marine area along the reserve's coast were designated as a marine nature reserve, given the presence of coral reefs in relatively good condition within the reserve's coastal waters. The reserve's boundary was demarcated in 2001, and in 2010, a decree issued by the Indonesian Minister of Forestry determined the area as 454.616 hectares of nature reserve area and 34.321 hectares of nature park area.

== Geography ==
Topographically, the northern areas of Pananjung Nature Reserve/Nature Park are generally sloping to slightly hilly with an altitude of between 0–20 meters above sea level, whereas the southern part of the area is a hilly region which stretches along the coast. The southern area also has many small capes and steep, rocky coastlines. The nature reserve also has two rivers, Cikamal and Cirengganis, which both drain into the Indian Ocean. There are grasslands in the nature reserve area, mostly occupied by ungulates like bantengs and Timor deer, although some have become abandoned and turned into secondary forests.

The area has a tropical climate with average 3,196 mm of annual rainfall, temperatures ranging from 25–30 °C and around 80–90% of humidity levels.

The nature reserve is covered by two different geological formations. The Kalipucang Formation lies on the north and is composed of coralline limestone, dating from around Middle to Late Miocene epoch. Karsts within this formation manifests itself as isolated hills and caves with stalactites and stalagmites. The much older, Oligocene Jampang Formation lies on the southern part of the reserve and has a more rocky, rugged terrain, consisting of volcanogenic breccias, tuff with lava lenses intercalated with lithic sandstone, mudstone, marl, and conglomerate pebbly sandstone, and diamictite intercalation.

== Biodiversity ==
=== Flora ===
Rafflesia patma flower

80% of the surrounding flora consists of old secondary forests, while the remainder are primary forests.

- Rafflesia patma
- Vitex pinnata
- Dillenia excelsa
- Cratoxylum formosum
- Buchanania arborescens
- Ficus variegata
- Artocarpus elasticus
- Calophyllum inophyllum
- Hibiscus tiliaceus
- Terminalia catappa
- Barringtonia asiatica
- Teak
- Swietenia mahagoni
- Acacia auriculiformis
- Pandanus tectorius
- Dysoxylum excelsum

=== Fauna ===
Javan rusa (Rusa timorensis) in Pananjung Nature Reserve

- Crab-eating macaque
- East Javan langur
- Malayan porcupine
- Sunda pangolin
- Javan rusa
- Java mouse-deer
- Black-banded barbet
- Sunda pied hornbill
- Green junglefowl
- Sunda flying lemur
- Indian python
- Banteng

The 1982 eruption of Mount Galunggung caused a decrease in banteng population. As of early 2025, the Cikamal grasslands are off limits to visitors for banteng reintroduction. The deer population is experiencing decline in population and behavioral changes due to frequent contact with humans on the beach and the settlements, decrease in natural food source, and damages in the barrier wall infrastructure.

=== Marine life ===
The marine life within the nature reserve is dominated by many kinds of hard corals (Scleractinia). The marine areas also has many tropical fishes such as bannerfish, butterflyfish, sweetlips, angelfish, etc.

== Feature ==
Informative plaque regarding the history of the Japanese Cave

The Pananjung Nature Reserve is known for its white, sandy beaches, known as Pasir Putih. Located on the western side, it is one of the most popular tourism site in Pangandaran. The western coast of this nature reserve also home to the wreckage of an illegal fishing ship that was detonated by former Indonesian minister of Maritime Affairs and Fisheries, Susi Pudjiastuti in 2016. The wreckage is located near Cape Batu Mandi.

The reserve is also known for having many caves and other structures of cultural and historical significance. On the western area, there is a cave known as Gua Jepang ("Japanese Cave"), which was built during the time when the Japanese army occupied Indonesia. It was reportedly built by forced labor for about a year. Natural caves are commonly found on the northern and eastern side, such as Gua Panggung, Gua Parat, and Gua Lanang.

On the northern part of the reserve lies the Batu Kalde Temple, an archaeological site dating back to the Hindu-Buddhist kingdom era. The site was discovered by N.J. Krom in 1915 and excavation started around 1977.
