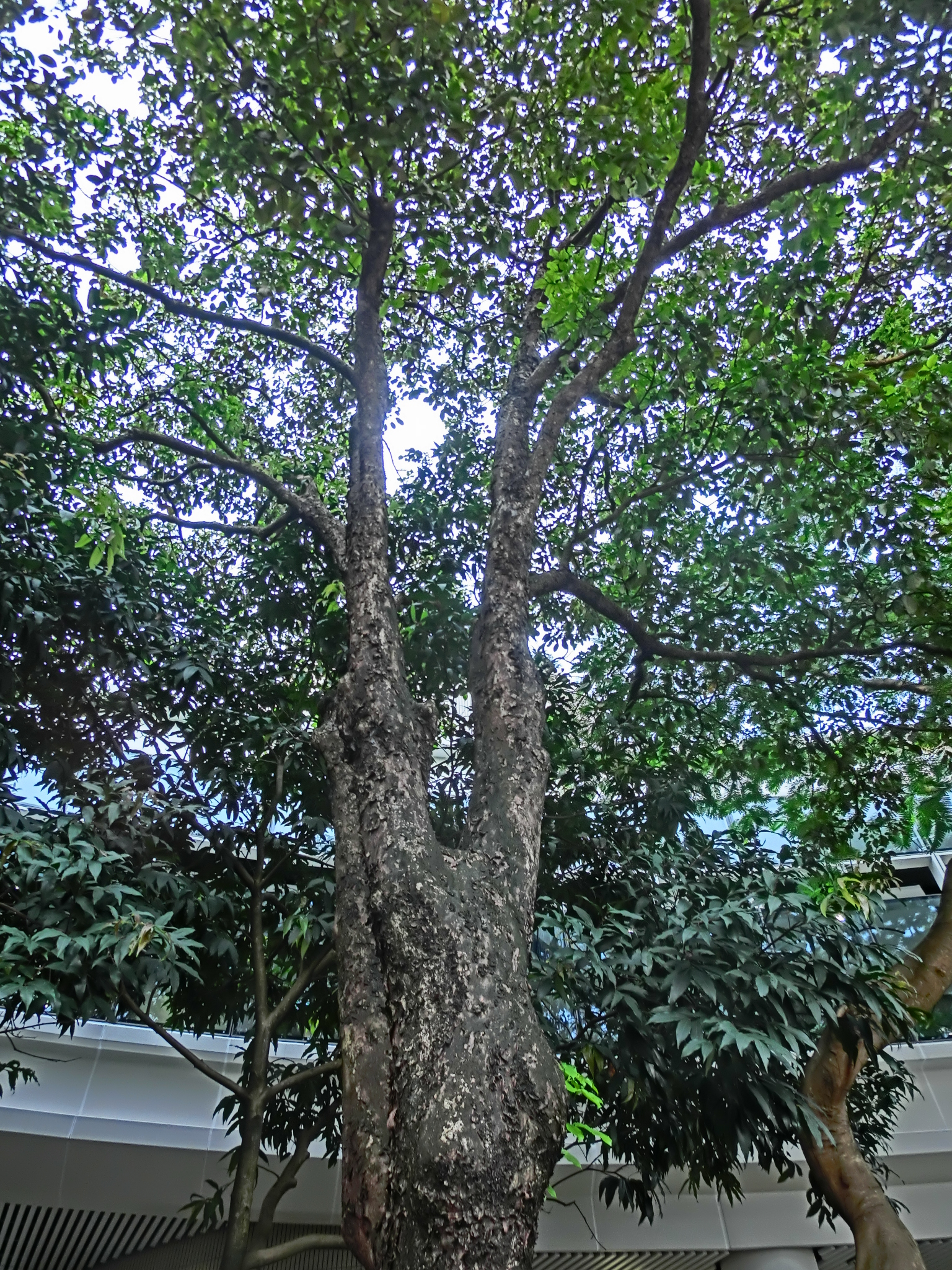
- Bischofia polycarpa in Victoria Park, Hong Kong

Scientific classification
- Kingdom: Plantae
- Clade: Tracheophytes
- Clade: Angiosperms
- Clade: Eudicots
- Clade: Rosids
- Order: Malpighiales
- Family: Phyllanthaceae
- Genus: Bischofia
- Species: B. polycarpa

Binomial name
- Bischofia polycarpa (H.Lév.) Airy Shaw

= Bischofia polycarpa =

Species of plant

Bischofia polycarpa, or Chinese bishop wood (Chinese: 重陽木), is a plant species of the family Phyllanthaceae. It and the related Bischofia javanica are the only two members of genus Bischofia and tribe Bischofieae.
