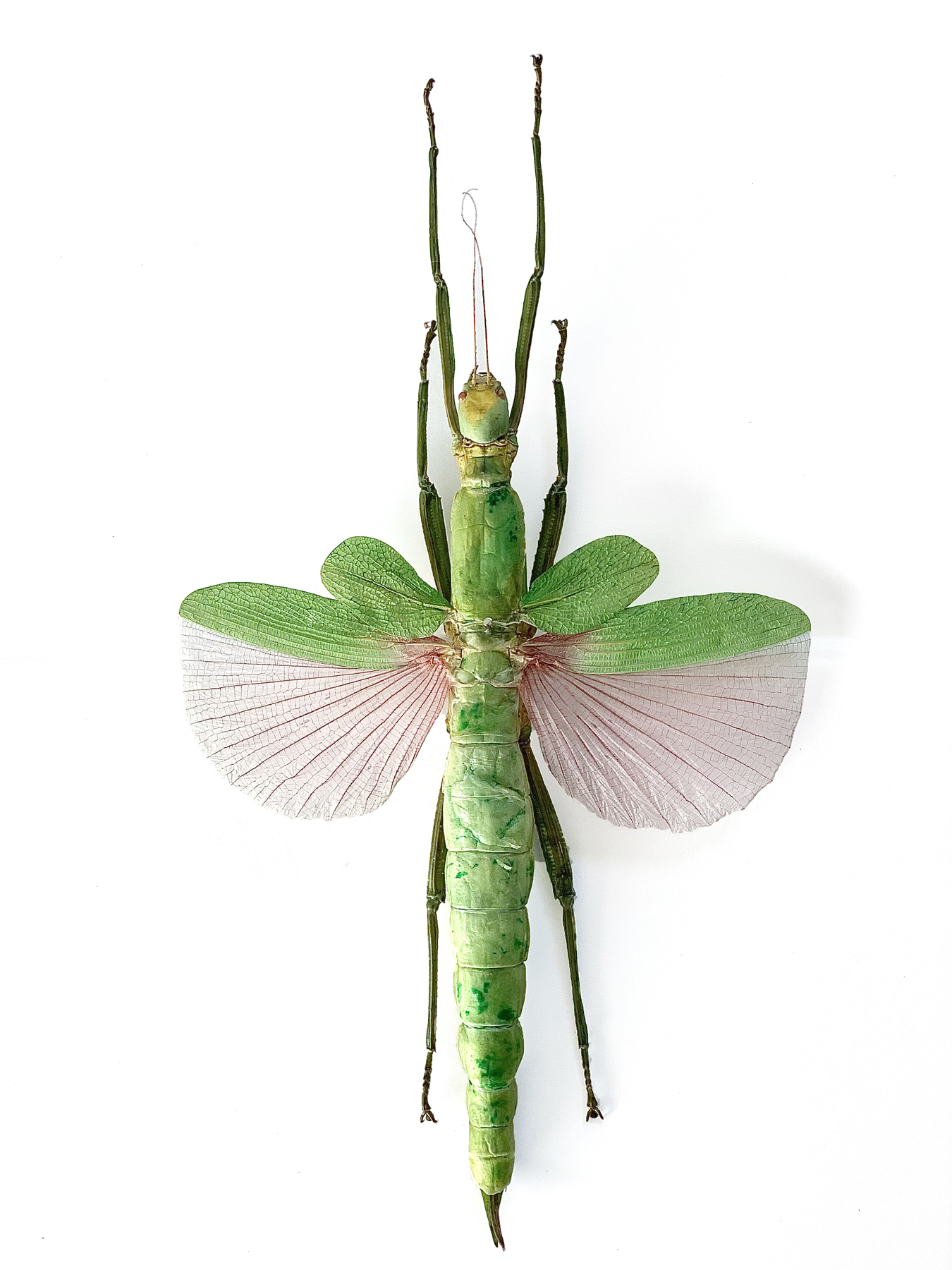
- Platycrana viridana specimen from the private collection of Andrew Markey

Scientific classification
- Domain: Eukaryota
- Kingdom: Animalia
- Phylum: Arthropoda
- Class: Insecta
- Order: Phasmatodea
- Family: Phasmatidae
- Subfamily: Platycraninae
- Genus: Platycrana; Gray, 1835
- Species: P. viridana

Binomial name
- Platycrana viridana (Olivier, 1792)

Synonyms
- Platycrania Burmeister, 1838

= Platycrana =

Genus of stick insects

Platycrana is the type genus of the reconstituted subfamily Platycraninae: which are stick insects from the Asia-Pacific region. They belong to the monotypic tribe Platycranini Brunner von Wattenwyl, 1893.

== Species ==
This is a monotypic genus, with Platycrana viridana (Olivier, 1792): originally described as "Mantis viridana" Olivier AG; the type locality in the Moluccas.
