= Hermarchus (phasmid) =

Scientific classification
- Domain: Eukaryota
- Kingdom: Animalia
- Phylum: Arthropoda
- Class: Insecta
- Order: Phasmatodea
- Family: Phasmatidae
- Tribe: Stephanacridini
- Genus: Hermarchus; Stål, 1875

Genus of stick insects

Hermarchus is a genus of very large stick insects within the order Phasmatodea and the tribe of Stephanacridini. Known species occur in New Guinea, Fiji, Australia, Philippines and New Caledonia.

== Description and biology ==
Females are often 200 to 240 mm long (body length), depending on species. The males are winged, while wings are lacking in the larger females. In captivity, they are known to feed upon the leaves of plants such as eucalyptus, guava, bramble and acacia.

== Species ==
The Phasmida Species File lists:

- Hermarchus apollonius (Westwood, 1859)
- Hermarchus differens Redtenbacher, 1908
- Hermarchus insignis (Kaup & Heyden, 1871)
- Hermarchus leytensis Zompro, 1997
- Hermarchus novaebritanniae (Wood-Mason, 1877)
- Hermarchus pythonius (Westwood, 1859) - type species (as Phibalosoma pythonius Westwood)
- Hermarchus trigonus (Thunberg, 1815)
- Hermarchus virga Redtenbacher, 1908
