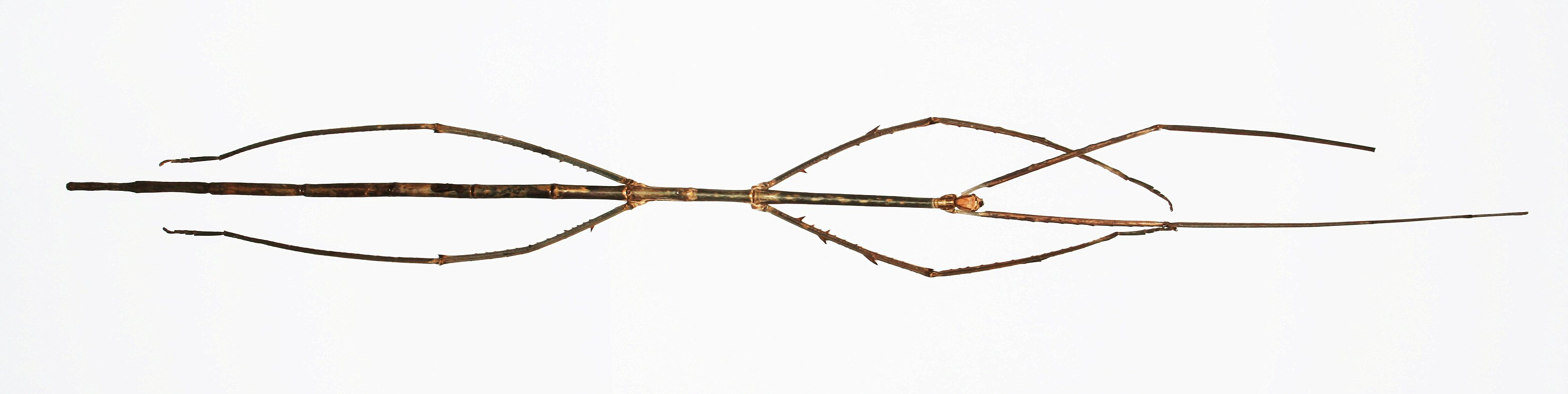
- Sadyattes chani female

Scientific classification
- Kingdom: Animalia
- Phylum: Arthropoda
- Clade: Pancrustacea
- Class: Insecta
- Order: Phasmatodea
- Family: Phasmatidae
- Subfamily: Platycraninae
- Tribe: Stephanacridini
- Genus: Sadyattes; Stål, 1875

Synonyms
- Eucarcharus Brunner v. Wattenwyl, 1907

= Sadyattes (insect) =

Genus of insects

Sadyattes is a genus of stick insects in the subfamily Platycraninae and tribe Stephanacridini. Species have a known distribution from Sumatra and Borneo.

== Species ==
Sadyattes includes the following species:

1. Sadyattes annulatus (Redtenbacher, 1908)
2. Sadyattes borrii Stål, 1875 - type species
3. Sadyattes enganensis (Redtenbacher, 1908)
4. Sadyattes nigricornis (Redtenbacher, 1908)
