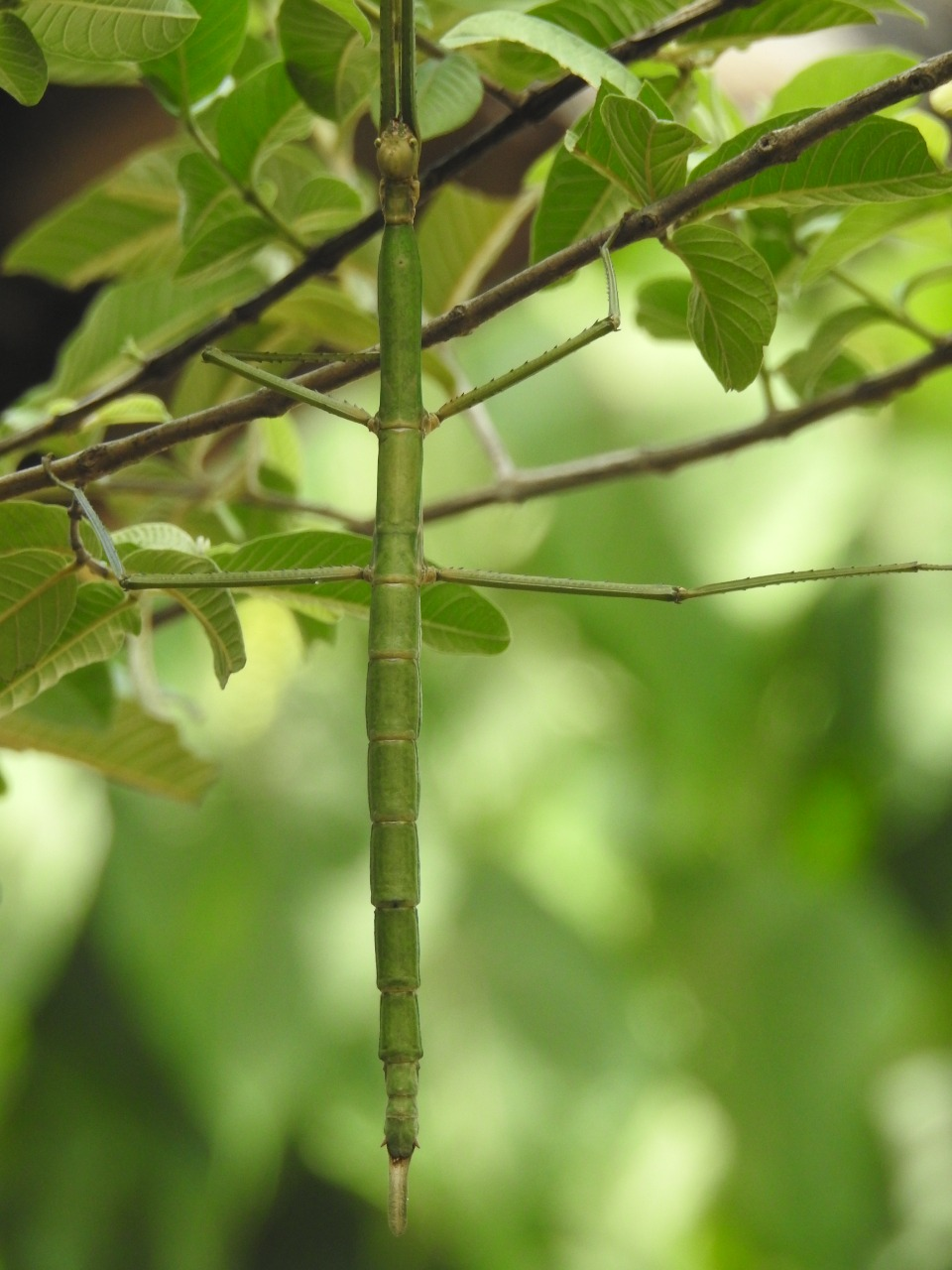
- Adult female Nesiophasma sobesonbaii from Timor

Scientific classification
- Domain: Eukaryota
- Kingdom: Animalia
- Phylum: Arthropoda
- Class: Insecta
- Order: Phasmatodea
- Family: Phasmatidae
- Subfamily: Platycraninae
- Tribe: Stephanacridini
- Genus: Nesiophasma; Günther, 1935

Synonyms
- Mylothrus Günther, 1935

= Nesiophasma =

Genus of stick insects

Nesiophasma is a genus of very large stick insects within the order Phasmatodea and the tribe of Stephanacridini. This genus is found in Wallacea west of Weber’s Line: Sulawesi, Peleng Island, Selayar Island, Kalaotoa Island, Sanana Island, Romang Island, Timor Island, Sangihe Island and Talaud Islands. New Guinea with doubt. The largest in the list of species is Nesiophasma giganteum, with females reaching a body length of 30 cm (12 inches).

== Species ==
The Phasmida Species File lists:

- Nesiophasma giganteum Hennemann, Le Tirant & Purwanto, 2021
- Nesiophasma kuehni (Brunner von Wattenwyl, 1907)
- Nesiophasma oligarches (Günther, 1935)
- Nesiophasma plateni (Dohrn, 1910)
- Nesiophasma sananaense Hennemann, 2021
- Nesiophasma sobesonbaii Hennemann, Damastra, Damaledo, Cumming, & Le Tirant, 2023
- Nesiophasma spinulosum (Brunner von Wattenwyl, 1907)
- Nesiophasma turbans (Brunner von Wattenwyl, 1907)
- Nesiophasma zanum Hennemann, 1999
