= Quercus kinabaluensis =

Conservation status
- Endangered (IUCN 3.1)

Scientific classification
- Kingdom: Plantae
- Clade: Embryophytes
- Clade: Tracheophytes
- Clade: Spermatophytes
- Clade: Angiosperms
- Clade: Eudicots
- Clade: Rosids
- Order: Fagales
- Family: Fagaceae
- Genus: Quercus
- Subgenus: Quercus subg. Cerris
- Section: Quercus sect. Cyclobalanopsis
- Species: Q. kinabaluensis

Binomial name
- Quercus kinabaluensis Soepadmo (1968)

Species of plant

Quercus kinabaluensis is a species of oak endemic to the mountains of Borneo. It is placed in Quercus subgenus Cerris, section Cyclobalanopsis.

== Range and habitat ==
Quercus kinabaluensis is found in a limited area of the mountains of northern Borneo, including on Mount Kinabalu, in Sabah state of Malaysia. It grows in montane tropical rain forest on basic soils from 457 to 2,438 metres elevation.
