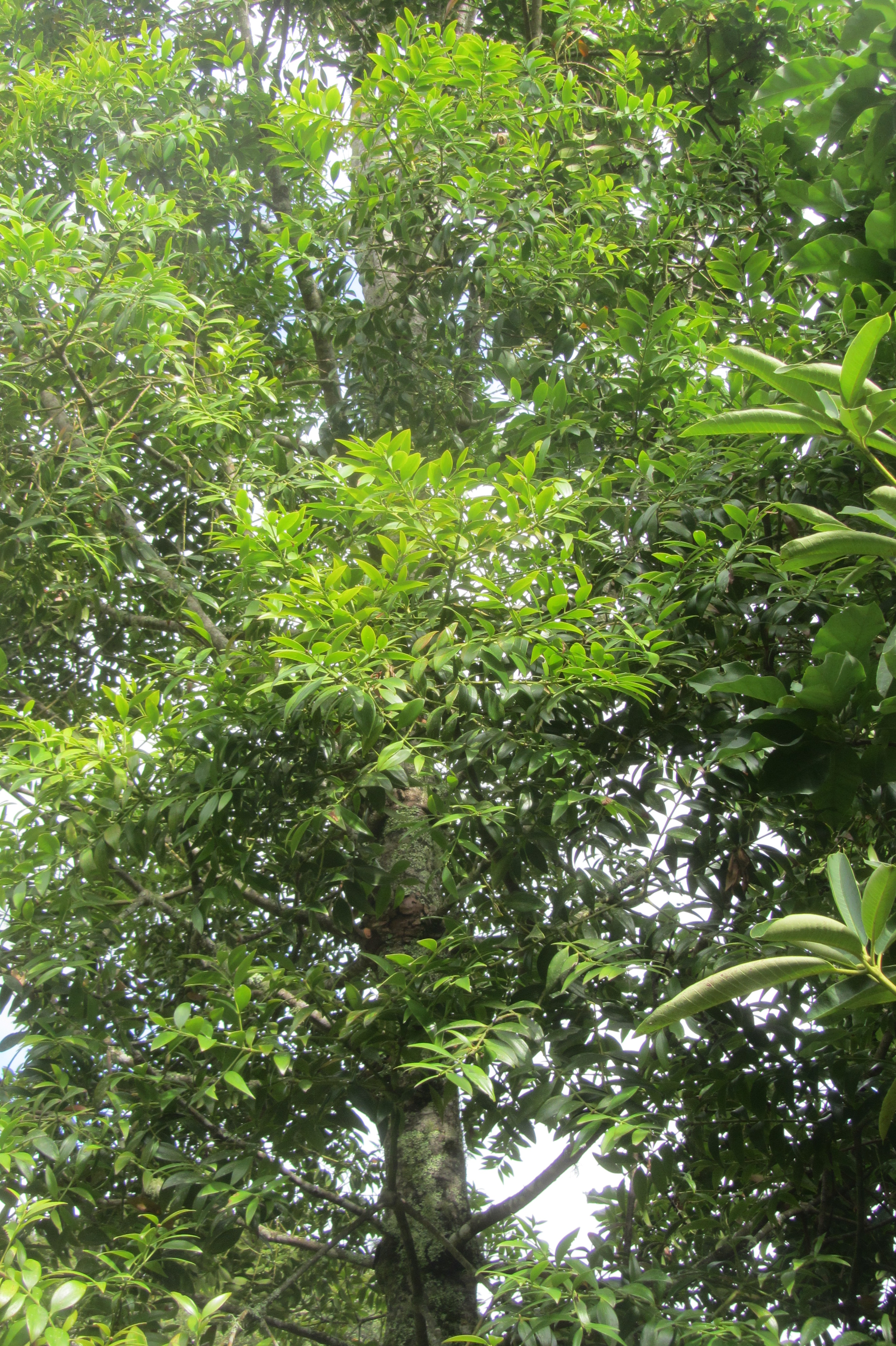
- At Auckland War Memorial Museum

Conservation status
- Endangered (IUCN 3.1)

Scientific classification
- Kingdom: Plantae
- Clade: Tracheophytes
- Clade: Gymnosperms
- Division: Pinophyta
- Class: Pinopsida
- Order: Araucariales
- Family: Araucariaceae
- Genus: Agathis
- Species: A. kinabaluensis

Binomial name
- Agathis kinabaluensis de Laub.

= Agathis kinabaluensis =

Species of conifer

Agathis kinabaluensis is a species of coniferous tree in the family Araucariaceae, endemic to Borneo. The specific epithet kinabaluensis refers to the species being native to Mount Kinabalu in Sabah.

== Description ==
Agathis kinabaluensis grows as a tree up to 36 metres (120 ft) tall. Its bark is dark brown. The male cones are cylindrical in shape, the female ones ovoid.

== Distribution and habitat ==
Agathis kinabaluensis is endemic to Borneo where it is confined to Mount Kinabalu in Sabah and Mount Murud in Sarawak, both protected areas. Its habitat is upper montane forests from 1,500 m (5,000 ft) to 2,400 m (8,000 ft) elevation.
