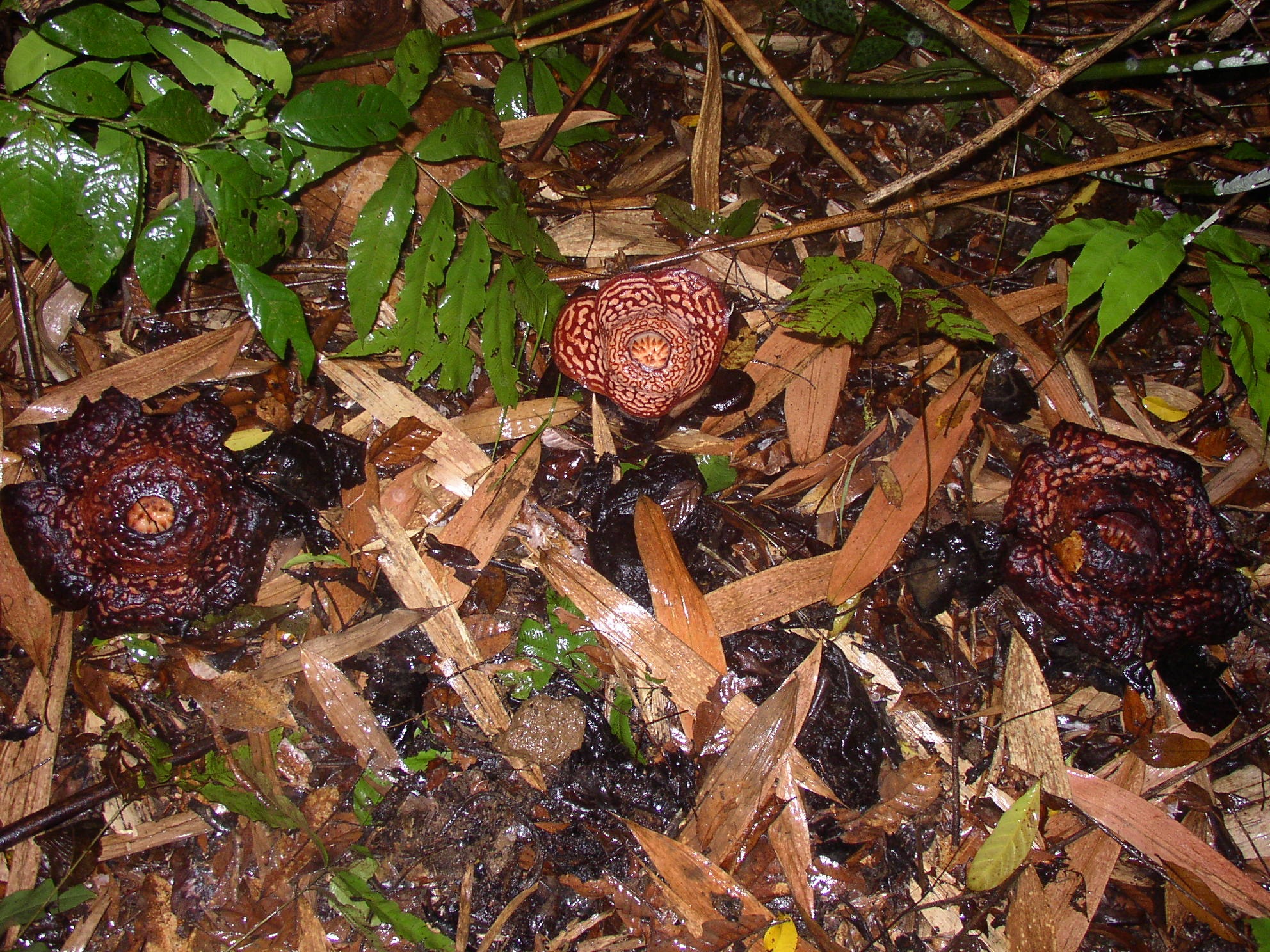
- Three flowers of Rafflesia pricei near Mount Kinabalu

Scientific classification
- Kingdom: Plantae
- Clade: Tracheophytes
- Clade: Angiosperms
- Clade: Eudicots
- Clade: Rosids
- Order: Malpighiales
- Family: Rafflesiaceae
- Genus: Rafflesia
- Species: R. pricei

Binomial name
- Rafflesia pricei Meijer

= Rafflesia pricei =

Species of flowering plant

Rafflesia pricei is a parasitic flowering plant endemic to Borneo. It is named after amateur botanist William Price, who discovered the species on Mount Kinabalu in the 1960s. The Rafflesia Forest Reserve was established mainly to protect the species.
