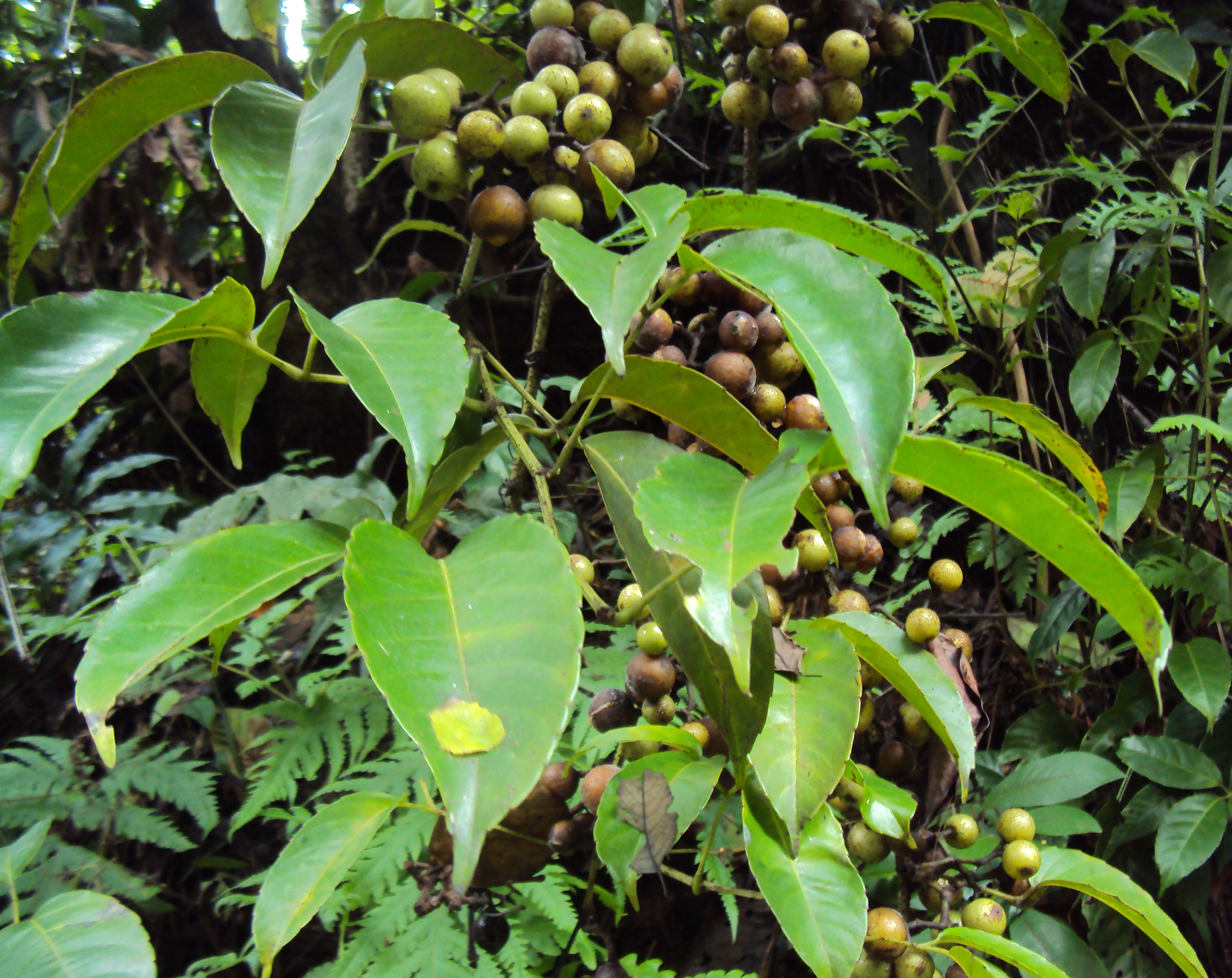

Scientific classification
- Kingdom: Plantae
- Clade: Tracheophytes
- Clade: Angiosperms
- Clade: Eudicots
- Clade: Rosids
- Order: Vitales
- Family: Vitaceae
- Genus: Tetrastigma
- Species: T. leucostaphylum

Binomial name
- Tetrastigma leucostaphylum (Dennst.) Alston ex Mabb.

Synonyms
- Cissus assimilis Kurz ex M.A.Lawson; Cissus dioica Roxb. ex DC.; Cissus feminea Roxb.; Cissus foemina Steud.; Cissus lanceolaria Roxb.; Cissus leucostaphyla Dennst.; Cissus mucronata Hook. & Arn. ex Steud.; Cissus pedata Náves ex Fern.-Vill.; Cissus serratifolia Rottler ex Wight; Tetrastigma kunstleri (King) Craib; Tetrastigma lanceolarium Planch.; Tetrastigma muricatum Gamble; Vitis kunstleri King; Vitis lanceolaria Wall.; Vitis leucostaphyla Dennst.; Vitis muricata Wall. ex Wight & Arn.; Vitis serratifolia (Rottler ex Wight) Wight & Arn.

= Tetrastigma leucostaphylum =

Species of vine

Tetrastigma leucostaphylum, the Indian chestnut vine, is a flowering plant in the family Vitaceae. It is native to Sri Lanka, India, Nepal and South East Asia.

Its leaves are in clusters of three, five or seven and fan out from a single point. The middle one is often the biggest.

== Ecology ==
=== Relationship with Rafflesia ===
In Sumatra, Tetrastigma leucostaphylum serves as host for the world's largest flower, the parasitic plant Rafflesia arnoldii. In Rafflesia Forest Reserve in Borneo, Tetrastigma leucostaphylum hosts Rafflesia pricei.

== Medicinal Use ==
The Indian chestnut vine is used in various ways by traditional people.

== Conservation ==
The conservation status of the Indian chestnut vine is not verified. It is not listed on the IUCN Red List.
