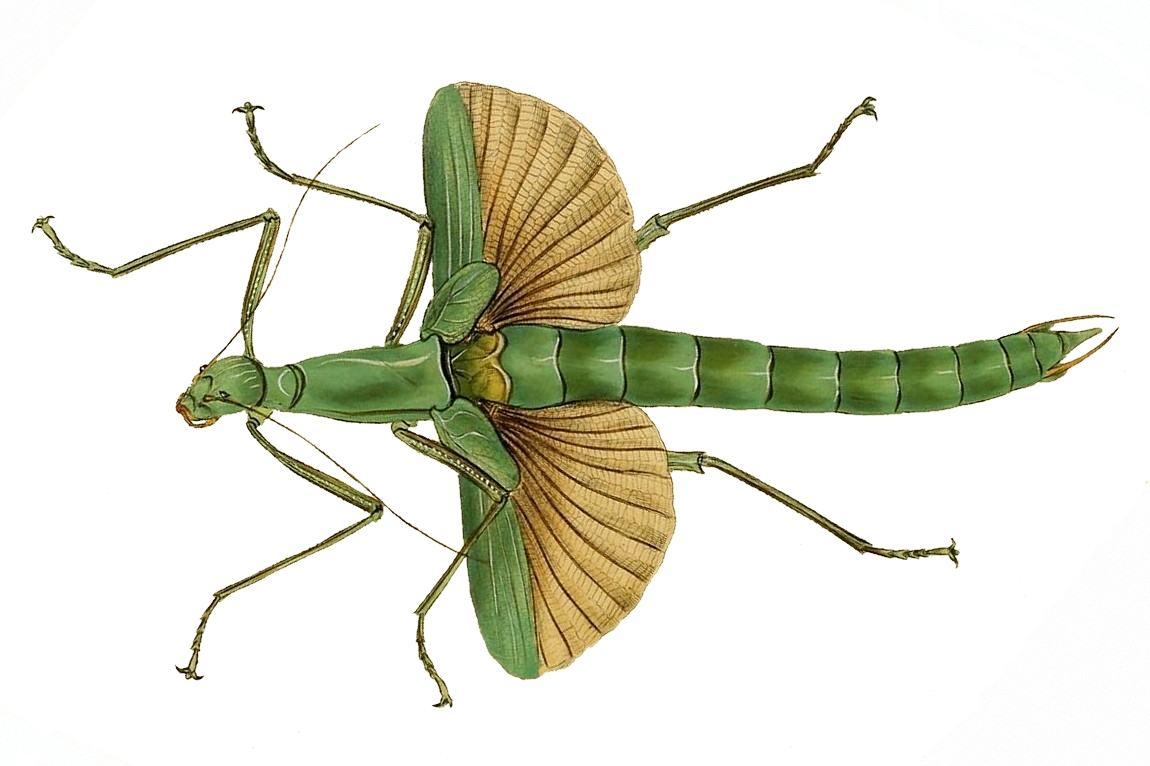
- Platycrana viridana

Scientific classification
- Domain: Eukaryota
- Kingdom: Animalia
- Phylum: Arthropoda
- Class: Insecta
- Order: Phasmatodea
- Suborder: Euphasmatodea
- Infraorder: Anareolatae
- Family: Phasmatidae
- Subfamily: Platycraninae; Brunner von Wattenwyl, 1893

= Platycraninae =

Subfamily of stick insects

Platycraninae are an anareolate subfamily of stick insects in the family Phasmatidae. Their known distribution includes southern, southeast Asia and Australasia.

== Genera ==
The Phasmida Species File lists two tribes:

monotypic tribe Platycranini Brunner von Wattenwyl, 1893

- Platycrana Gray, 1835

=== Stephanacridini ===
Auth: Günther, 1953

1. Diagoras Stål, 1877 - monotypic Diagoras ephialtes Stål, 1877
2. Eucarcharus Brunner von Wattenwyl, 1907
3. Hermarchus Stål, 1875
4. Macrophasma Hennemann & Conle, 2006
5. Nesiophasma Günther, 1934
6. Phasmotaenia Navas, 1907
7. Sadyattes Stål, 1875
8. Stephanacris Redtenbacher, 1908
