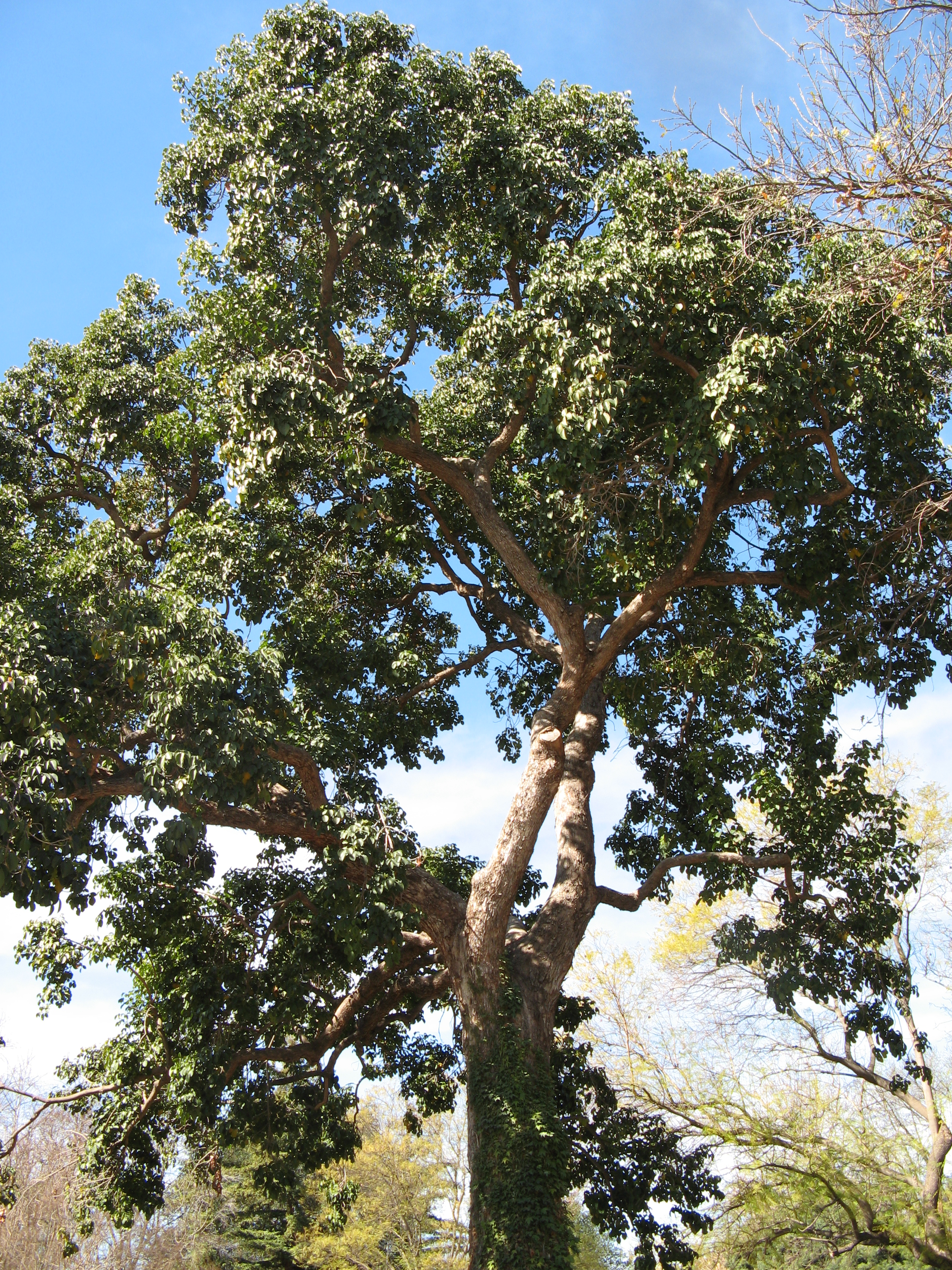

Conservation status
- Least Concern (IUCN 3.1)

Scientific classification
- Kingdom: Plantae
- Clade: Tracheophytes
- Clade: Angiosperms
- Clade: Eudicots
- Clade: Rosids
- Order: Malpighiales
- Family: Phyllanthaceae
- Genus: Bischofia
- Species: B. javanica

Binomial name
- Bischofia javanica Blume

Synonyms
- Andrachne apetala Roxb. ex Benth., nom. nud.; Andrachne trifoliata Roxb.; Bischofia javanica var. genuina Müll.Arg., not validly publ.; Bischofia javanica var. lanceolata Müll.Arg.; Bischofia javanica var. oblongifolia (Decne.) Müll.Arg.; Bischofia javanica var. toui (Decne.) Müll.Arg.; Bischofia leptopoda Müll.Arg.; Bischofia oblongifolia Decne.; Bischofia roeperiana Decne.; Bischofia toui Decne.; Bischofia trifoliata (Roxb.) Hook.; Microelus roeperianus (Decne.) Wight & Arn.; Phyllanthus gymnanthus Baill.; Stylodiscus trifoliatus (Roxb.) Benn.

= Bischofia javanica =

Bishop wood

Species of flowering plant

Bischofia javanica, or bishop wood, is a plant species of the family Phyllanthaceae. It and the related Bischofia polycarpa are the only two members of genus Bischofia and tribe Bischofieae. These species are distributed throughout southern and southeast Asia to Australia and Polynesia also in North America (brought to North America as a decorative plant but now considered to be an invasive species). The tree is commonly used by tigers to scratch-mark territory in the jungles of Assam where it is locally called uriam. They also occur in southwestern, central, eastern, and southern China, and also Taiwan, where the indigenous people consider it a sacred tree.

== Uses ==
- The dark red, dense wood is used as a building material for items ranging from furniture to bridges; it is durable but is difficult to air-dry. It is also ideal as firewood.
- The fruits are used in making wine.
- The seeds, which are edible, contain 30–54% oil, which is used as a lubricant.
- The bark has a high tannin content and is used as a source of red dye to stain rattan baskets and colour tapa cloth.
- The roots are used medicinally.
- The leaves are eaten in Southern Laos dipped into chili sauce.
