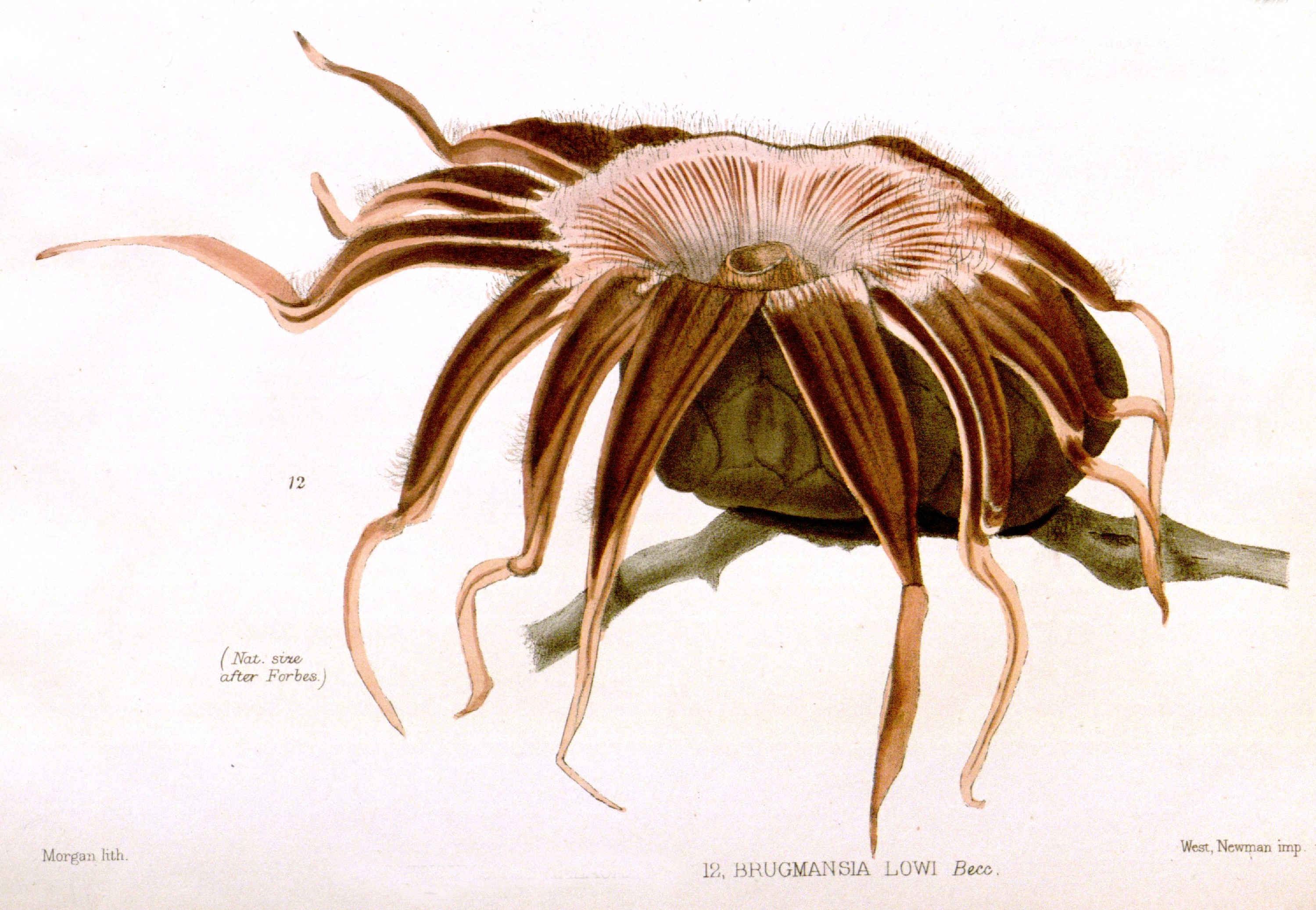

Scientific classification
- Kingdom: Plantae
- Clade: Tracheophytes
- Clade: Angiosperms
- Clade: Eudicots
- Clade: Rosids
- Order: Malpighiales
- Family: Rafflesiaceae
- Genus: Rhizanthes
- Species: R. lowii

Binomial name
- Rhizanthes lowii (Becc.) Harms

Synonyms
- Brugmansia lowii Becc.; Mycetanthe lowii (Becc.) Hochr.

= Rhizanthes lowii =

Species of flowering plant

Rhizanthes lowii is a species of parasitic flowering plant without leaves, stems, roots, or photosynthetic tissue. It grows on the roots of the Tetrastigma vine. It includes the specimens with the largest measured flowers in Rhizanthes, from 25 to 43 cm (10 to 17 inches) across. The flowers are endothermic, not only producing their own heat, but they also have the rare ability to regulate their own temperature.

== Taxonomy ==
Rhizanthes lowii was originally described by Odoardo Beccari as Brugmansia lowii in 1868, being the second of such Brugmansia species (The name Brugmansia is now used for a Solanaceous genus related to Datura). Bénédict Pierre Georges Hochreutiner recombined the taxon in 1930 to a new genus, Mycetanthe, but Hermann Harms recombined the taxon again in 1934, to give it its present name.

== Distribution ==
It was first collected on a little islet (in a river?) near the Malaysian town of Limbang, almost at the border of Brunei.

Originally, the species was believed to be present in the tropical forests of Borneo, Sumatra, southern Thailand and Peninsular Malaysia, but after the 2000 revision of the genus Rhizanthes, the specimens collected in Sumatra, Thailand and Malaysia were reinterpreted as two new, different species, on the basis of groups of morphological traits: Rh. deceptor and Rh. infanticida. Thus the species as it is now circumscribed as of 2000 is endemic to Borneo, where it was originally described from. Despite this, the Plants of the World Online database for some reason states the distribution is restricted to Peninsular Malaysia.

It has also been seen as a synonym of Rh. zippelii by some authors, although this interpretation was not followed by most authorities. It is extremely difficult, if not always possible in some cases, to tell the four different species in Rhizanthes apart on the basis of morphology. Even more confusingly, plants of Rh. zippelii have also been identified (and photographed) from western Borneo, with the taxonomic changes, they can now be classified as Rh. lowii, despite looking like Rh. zippelii.
