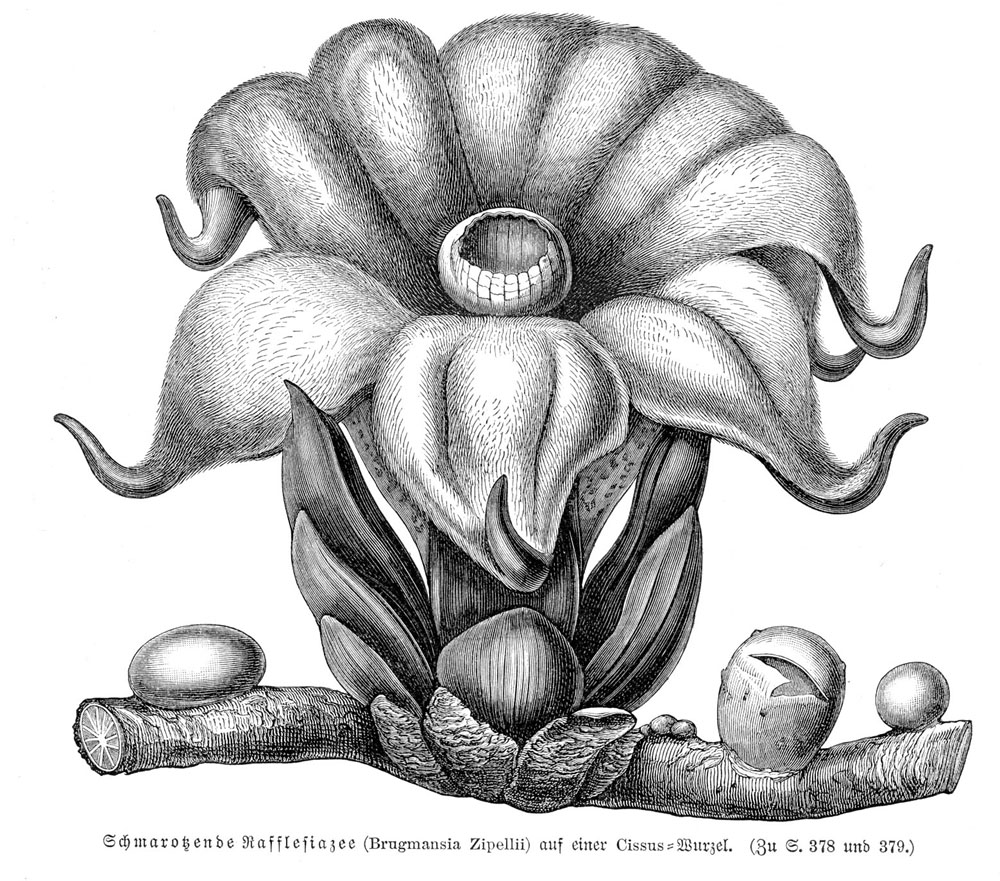

Scientific classification
- Kingdom: Plantae
- Clade: Tracheophytes
- Clade: Angiosperms
- Clade: Eudicots
- Clade: Rosids
- Order: Malpighiales
- Family: Rafflesiaceae
- Genus: Rhizanthes
- Species: R. zippelii

Binomial name
- Rhizanthes zippelii Blume (Spach)

Synonyms
- Brugmansia zippelii Blume; Mycetanthe zippelii (Blume) Hochr.; Zippelia brugmansia Rchb.; Brugmansia bakhuizenii Heinr.

= Rhizanthes zippelii =

Species of flowering plant

Rhizanthes zippelii is a species of parasitic flowering plant without leaves, stems, roots, or photosynthetic tissue. Its flowers bud out of the roots of the Tetrastigma vine. It is found in the tropical rainforests of Java. The flowers are reddish-brown, with long hanging tips, and are from 12 to 29 cm across.

== Taxonomy ==
Rhizanthes zippelii was first described as Brugmansia zippelii by Carl Ludwig Blume in Java in 1828, placed in a monotypic genus. A second species, B. lowii, followed, described by Odoardo Beccari in 1868. B. bakhuizenii was the third species, named by Emil Johann Lambert Heinricher after his 1903/04 trip to the island for a taxon with a different flower colour on Java. Bénédict Pierre Georges Hochreutiner recombined the taxon in 1930 to another genus, Mycetanthe, but then a few years later in 1934 Édouard Spach moved the species to another genus, Rhizanthes, as it is still classified in today.

In the 1963 (English version of the) Flora of Java C. A. Backer and R. C. Bakhuizen van den Brink reduced B. bakhuizenii to a synonym of Rh. zippelii. They recognised two forms -somewhat confusingly, perhaps over-modestly, leaving them nameless. The original form described by Blume had only been seen a handful of times; the form with which bakhuizenii was synonymised was found in the most number of places. They also proposed synonymising the enigmatic taxa described by Robert Brown in 1821, Rafflesia horsfieldii, to this last form. In 1988 Willem Meijer and J. F. Veldkamp explained that the difference in flower colour was the result of the normal change in flower colour that the occurred during anthesis -the whitish flower of the Blume form was simply a flower on its first day of opening, and thus found it unjustified to recognise the two forms.

The difference between the two species Rh. zippelii and Rh. lowii had always been unclear -the plants had only been collected a limited number of times, and Rh. lowii had been synonymised with the older species by Hooker in 1873, but this had been generally ignored by most people. In the 1930s the difference between the two species was thought to be the hairiness of the inside of the perigone tube - Rh. lowii being much smoother and less hairy. Based on this character, Rh. zippelii was collected for the first time in western Borneo in 1935.

In order to find a morphological basis for separating the taxa Meijer and Veldkamp used the 'ramenta' - minute stalked outgrowths found on the inside of the perigone tube, having found these useful in differentiating the related Rafflesia. Based on this, the Thai-Malayan population was reclassified from Rh. lowii to Rh. zippelii in 1988, but in 1997 Meijer reassessed them as Rh. lowii again, based on the same character. Bänziger, on the other hand, had been under the impression that Rh. zippelii had a white flower colour (as based on Blume's original account), and Rh. lowii brown, but after reading Meijer's account of the change in flower colour, Bänziger followed Hooker in synonymising the taxa in 1995. As had happened to Hooker, he was largely ignored.

Bänziger and Hansen were unsure of how applicable basing the species on the form of the ramenta alone was, finding the characters were inconsistent and did not clearly separate all the specimens into geographically distinct groups -for example, Blume's type specimen of Rh. zippelii lacked ramenta all together, and did specimens throughout the range, thus they resolved to use a larger group of morphological traits and the larger number of specimens which had been collected since 1988 to clear this up. They found that the ramenta were indeed mixed between specimens, but that the specimens could roughly be split into four 'groups', although some of these groups were only based on a handful of specimens. A number of characteristics were ambiguous, mixed or had ranges which overlapped with other groups, making them inadequate for differentiating taxa. Notwithstanding this, however, they decided to recognised their groups at a species level anyway, reasoning that regardless the phylogeny, it would be potentially more advantageous for non-scientific reasons to recognise them as four rare endemics.

=== Etymology ===
Blume commemorated the horticulturist and plant collector Alexander Zippelius with the specific epithet (an eponym), who partially assumed his duties at the Bogor Botanical Gardens in Java when Blume departed for the Low Countries to write a proper flora of the region. Zippelius collected the first specimens of this new species of plant on Mount Salak, not far from Bogor. Zippelius was an important collector for Blume, he died from disease in Timor during a botanical expedition to the Moluccas, western New Guinea and other islands of the region.

The generic epithet derives from the compound of the Ancient Greek words ῥίζα (pronounced rhíza), meaning 'root', with the word ἄνθος (anthos) meaning 'flower'.

== Distribution ==
Due to the taxonomic changes described above the distribution of Rhizanthes zippelii has changed with the change of perspectives. As it is now defined by Bänzinger and Hansen, Rh. zippelii is an endemic of Java. Rh. zippelii was collected for the first time in western Borneo in 1935, but the identification was based on characters which are now disregarded.

Writing in 1988, Meijer mentioned that the plant had not been seen on Java since before the Second World War. He mentions that botanists were likely the main reason for the decline of the species, at least at Mount Salak, the most well-known collecting locality near Bogor. Another reason for its continued absence was the further development of plantations in the area, but he suspected that the main reason why the plant had not been seen for such a long time was that the network of dedicated volunteers taking 'jungle hikes' in search of the flowers had disappeared when the Dutch colonial period ended, as had the Dutch-language journals which published information and coordinated people interested in such plants. Moreover, many of the old collecting localities had not been visited by botanists for many decades. Thus he doubted the species was extinct on Java. He mentioned that the old network was being replaced with high-school students taking such jungle excursions, but that their level of botanical knowledge was not yet adequate. By 2000, it had been found on Java again.

Despite this, the Plants of the World Online database for some reason states that this species does not occur where it was collected from, Java, but that the distribution is Peninsular Malaysia and Myanmar, but not Thailand in between the two countries.

== Description ==
The giant flowers are from 12 to 18 cm when mature, exceptionally 29 cm across. The only plants on Java remotely similar to Rhizanthes zippelii are those of the genus Rafflesia, but the similarly giant and foul-smelling flowers of Rafflesia always have five perianth-lobes. Rh. zippelii, on the other hand, has many more -how many more varies, but there are generally 14 to 18 of such lobes, although 16 is the most common. These lobes are furthermore different by ending in a long hanging strips, with its reddish-brown flesh colour and texture, the flower thus looking like a big, fat, dead octopus on its head.

The flower is scentless when it first opens, but the odour soon grows fetid and rank, smelling of rotting carrion. The flower also changes colour as it opens: at first it is white or red, but over the following days it turns brown with anthesis, eventually turning black with senescence. The texture of the perianth (the big outer parts) is firm and fleshy to stiff and leathery. The outside of the flower is smooth to the touch (glabrous), but the inside has many hairs and minuscule, stalked warts. The hairs are long, brown and patent (spreading at around 45° from the surface -not erect or pressed to the surface). The inside of the perianth tube is coloured a sordid white, with many brown-coloured, longitudinal grooves.

The buds have around fifteen scales protecting the developing flower, these are semi-persistent, which means they remain connected to the flower after it opens, but can fall off with a little tug.

=== Similar species ===
Until 2000, there were two species of Rhizanthes, Rh. zippelii and Rh. lowii. There is no clear difference between the two species, they are indistinguishable without dissecting the flowers and examining their insides microscopically.

== Ecology ==
This strange plant is a holoparasite of the roots of the jungle liana Tetrastigma papillosum, a plant related to the grape vine. The flowers bud out of the thicker base roots of the vine, just below the surface of the soil. In the Sundanese language the host vine is known as susuan, thus the name for Rhizanthes zippelii is perut susuan, the 'belly of susuan'. It appears to prefer to grow in the densest thickets in tropical rainforest on steep slopes, which is one reason it is little seen.
