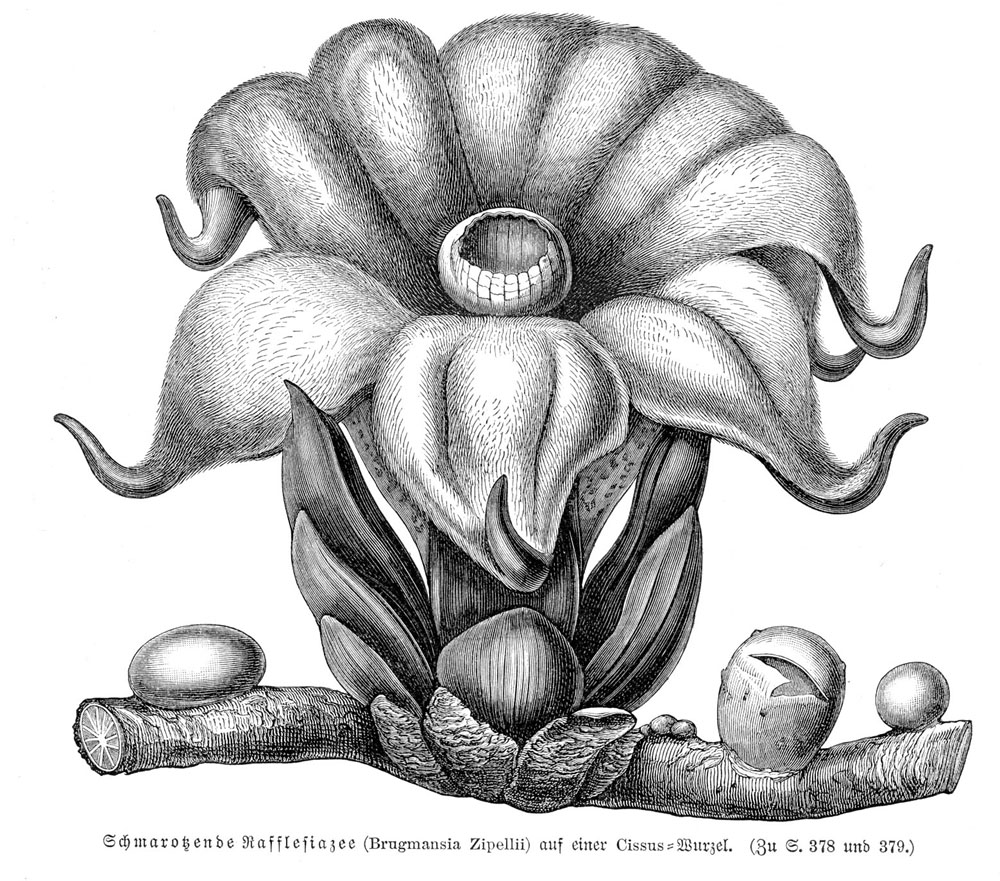
- Illustration of Rhizanthes (at the time known as Brugmansia, a name which now refers to the unrelated plant genus Brugmansia), from Der Bau und die Eigenschaften der Pflanzen (1913).

Scientific classification
- Kingdom: Plantae
- Clade: Tracheophytes
- Clade: Angiosperms
- Clade: Eudicots
- Clade: Rosids
- Order: Malpighiales
- Family: Rafflesiaceae
- Genus: Rhizanthes; Dumort.

Type species
- Rhizanthes zippelii Blume (Spach)

Synonyms
- Brugmansia Blume non Pers.; Brugmansia Rchb.; Zippelia Rchb.

= Rhizanthes =

Genus of flowering plants

Rhizanthes is a genus of four species of parasitic flowering plants in the family Rafflesiaceae. They are without leaves, stems, roots, or photosynthetic tissue, and grow within the roots of a few species of Tetrastigma vines. The genus is limited to the tropical forests of Southeast Asia. The flowers of Rhizanthes are very large, they vary from 14 to 43 cm in diameter. At least one species of Rhizanthes, Rh. lowii, is endothermic.

== Names ==
The Latin name derives from the compound of the Ancient Greek words ῥίζα (pronounced rhíza), meaning 'root', with the word ἄνθος (anthos) meaning 'flower'.

'Malay' vernacular names used for Rhizanthes zippelii according to Betty Molesworth Allen in 1967 were bunga pakma and bunga padma, presumably, with the taxonomic changes, those names could actually refer to any species except Rh. zippelii. The word bunga means flower; both names are shared by plants in the related genus Rafflesia.

== Description ==
The flowers of Rhizanthes are very large, varying from 14 to 43 cm in diameter. The flower is scentless when it first opens, but the odour soon grows fetid and rank, smelling of rotting carrion.

At least one species of Rhizanthes, Rh. lowii, is endothermic. It not only produces its own heat, but has the rare ability to regulate its own temperature.

=== Similar genera ===
The only plants remotely similar to Rhizanthes are those in the genus Rafflesia, but the similarly giant and foul-smelling flowers of Rafflesia always have five perianth-lobes. Rhizanthes, on the other hand, have many more—there are generally 14 to 18 of such lobes. These lobes are furthermore different by ending in a long hanging strips, with its flesh colour and texture, the flower thus looking like a big, fat, dead octopus on its head.

== Taxonomy ==
In the newest revision of the genus, Hans Bänziger and Bertel Hansen recognised the following species in 2000:

- Rhizanthes deceptor Bänziger & B.Hansen
- Rhizanthes infanticida Bänziger & B.Hansen
- Rhizanthes lowii (Becc.) Harms
- Rhizanthes zippelii (Blume) Spach

The first species to be discovered was Rh. zippelii, which was first described as Brugmansia zippelii in Java by Carl Ludwig Blume in 1828. The name Brugmansia had earlier been used to house the plants known as angel trumpets, but as this name had sunk into synonymy with Datura, this was generally ignored at the time. The genus was first proposed to be renamed by Barthélemy Charles Joseph Dumortier in 1829 when he also first created the family Rafflesiaceae, but this publication seems not to have been widely known. In 1841 Ludwig Reichenbach proposed to move the species to Mycetanthe, but he was similarly ignored. Brugmansia lowii was the second species to be named, described by Odoardo Beccari in 1868. B. bakhuizenii was the third species, named by Emil Johann Lambert Heinricher after his 1903/04 trip to the island for a taxon with a different flower colour on Java.

At least Reichenbach was remembered. In 1930 Bénédict Pierre Georges Hochreutiner moved two of the known taxa to his genus Mycetanthe. In 1934 Hermann Harms pointed out that Dumortier's name had priority, but he only moved M. lowii to Rhizanthes, not the type species of the genus Brugmansia. This was rectified by Édouard Spach the same year.

In the 1963 (English version of the) Flora of Java C. A. Backer and R. C. Bakhuizen van den Brink reduced B. bakhuizenii to a synonym of Rh. zippelii. They recognised two forms -somewhat confusingly, perhaps over-modestly, leaving them nameless. The form with which bakhuizenii was synonymised to was found in the most number of places, the original Blume form had only been seen a handful of times. In 1988 Willem Meijer and J. F. Veldkamp explained that the difference in flower colour was the result of the normal change in flower colour that the occurred during anthesis – the whitish flower of the Blume form was simply a flower on its first day of opening, and thus found it unjustified to recognise the two forms.

The difference between the two species Rh. zippelii and Rh. lowii had always been unclear -the plants had only been collected a limited number of times, and Rh. lowii has been synonymised with the older species at least twice by different workers (Hooker in 1873, Bänziger in 1995), but this had been generally ignored by most people. In order to find a morphological basis for separating the taxa Meijer and Veldkamp used the shapes of the 'ramenta' – minute stalked outgrowths found on the inside of the perigone tube, having found these useful in differentiating the related Rafflesia. Bänziger and Hansen were unsure of how applicable this was, finding the characters were inconsistent and did not clearly separate all of the specimens into geographically distinct groups, resolving to use a large group of morphological traits and the larger number of specimens which had since been collected to clear this up. They found that the ramenta were indeed mixed between specimens, but that they could roughly be split into four groups, although some of these 'groups' were only based on a handful of specimens. A number of characteristics were ambiguous, mixed or had ranges which overlapped with other groups, making them inadequate for differentiating taxa. Notwithstanding this, however, they decided to recognised their groups at a species level, reasoning that regardless the phylogeny, it would be potentially more advantageous to recognise them as four rare endemics for environmental, financial and political reasons, giving spunky names to their new taxa: Rh. deceptor and Rh. infanticida.

== Distribution ==
According to Bänziger and Hansen's new circumscription, specimens collected on Java belong to the species Rhizanthes zippelii, while specimens collected on Borneo belong to Rh. lowii. Those collected on Sumatra may belong to either Rh. deceptor or Rh. infanticida, and those collected in southern Thailand or western Malaysia belong to Rh. infanticida.

== Ecology ==
This strange plant is a holoparasite of the roots of the jungle lianas in the genus Tetrastigma, a plant related to the grape vine. In the Sundanese language the host vine Tetrastigma papillosum is known as susuan, thus the name for Rhizanthes zippelii is perut susuan, the 'belly of susuan'. Rhizanthes zippelii appears to prefer to grow in the densest thickets in tropical rainforest on steep slopes, which is one reason it is little seen.
