= Sapria myanmarensis =

Conservation status
- Endangered (IUCN 3.1)

Scientific classification
- Kingdom: Plantae
- Clade: Tracheophytes
- Clade: Angiosperms
- Clade: Eudicots
- Clade: Rosids
- Order: Malpighiales
- Family: Rafflesiaceae
- Genus: Sapria
- Species: S. myanmarensis

Binomial name
- Sapria myanmarensis Nob. Tanaka, Nagam, Tagane & M.M. Aung

Species of flowering plant

Sapria myanmarensis is a rare and endemic holoparasitic flowering plant related to Rafflesia found in Myanmar's northwestern part, in Kachin State and Sagaing Region. The species was similar to S. himalayana, but was distinguished due to its basally-distributed, white-colored warts on the vermilion perigone lobes, shorter perigone tubes, flat central disk with greater disk crest diameter, and crateriform ramenta. It was described in 2019.

== Etymology ==
The specific epithet derives from Myanmar, the name of the country where it was discovered.
