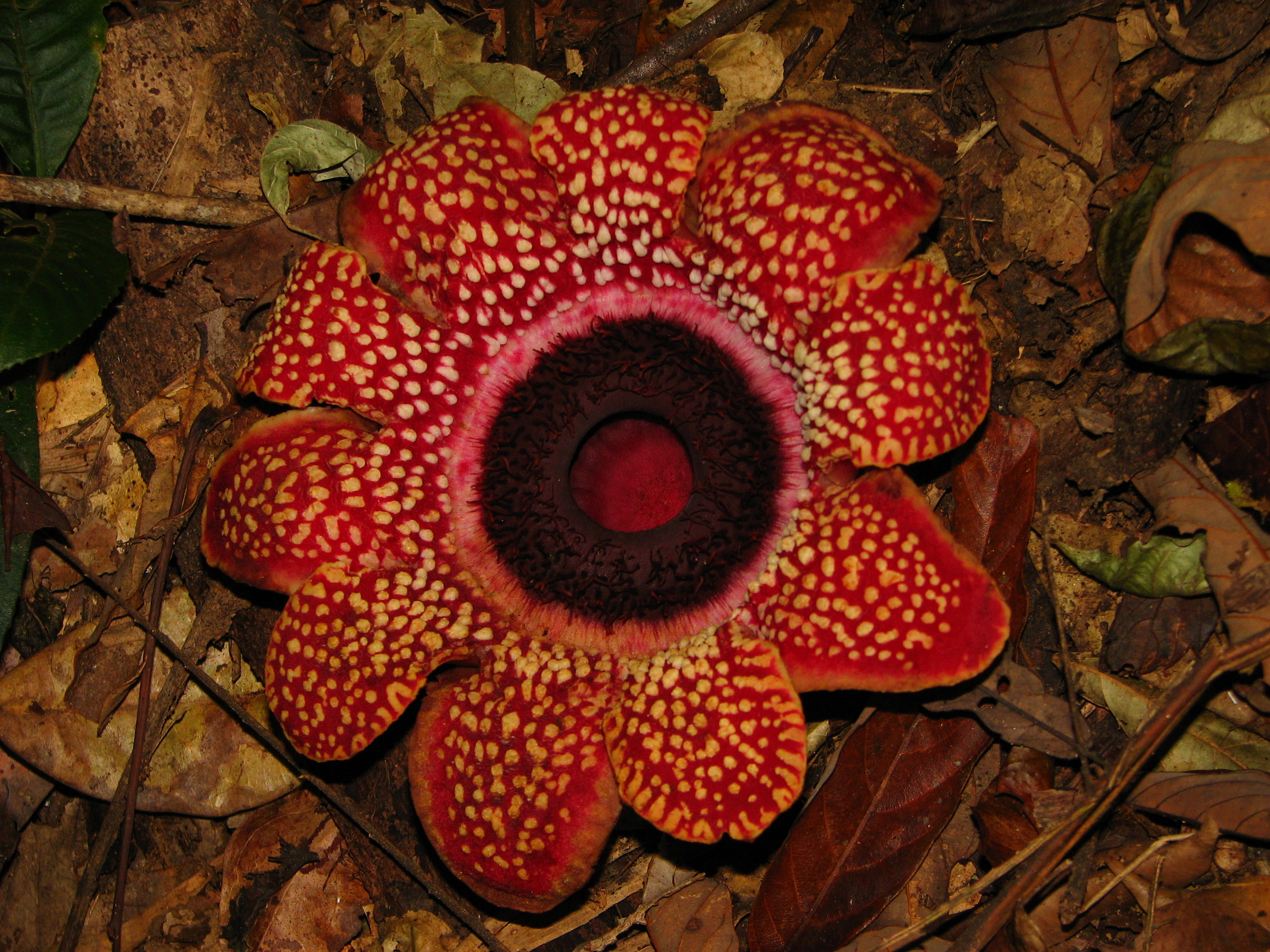
- Sapria himalayana flower

Scientific classification
- Kingdom: Plantae
- Clade: Tracheophytes
- Clade: Angiosperms
- Clade: Eudicots
- Clade: Rosids
- Order: Malpighiales
- Family: Rafflesiaceae
- Genus: Sapria
- Species: S. himalayana

Binomial name
- Sapria himalayana Griff.

Forms
- S. h. f. albovinosa; S. h. f. himalayana

Synonyms
- Richthofenia siamensis Hosseus; Sapria griffithiana R.Br.

= Sapria himalayana =

Species of flowering plant

Sapria himalayana, commonly known as the hermit's spittoon, is a rare holoparasitic flowering plant related to Rafflesia found in the Eastern Himalayas. Sapria himalayana represents the extreme manifestation of the parasitic mode, being completely dependent on its host plant for water, nutrients and products of photosynthesis which it sucks through a specialised root system called haustoria. These haustoria are attached to both the xylem and the phloem of the host plant.

== Description ==
As with all species of Sapria, the non-flowering parts of the plant are structures, called haustoria, that resemble fungal mycelia, and grow inside its host plant. The plant becomes visible during its blooming season which can start as early as August and be as late as April, with rose-pink buds the size of a grapefruit emerging at ground level towards the end of the local rainy season.

The flowers are monoecious, with each flower producing only pollen or fruits with seeds, but it is uncertain if they are dioecious, with each plant producing only one type of flower. Both pollen and seed flowers are found in the same area, but this could be due to a host plant having more than one of the parasitic plants growing within it. Each bloom is open for two or three days during which time they emit a putrid odour.

The flowers are typically 9.5–20 cm across, with an overall bell shape, the outer lobes of which resemble ten fleshy petals. The lobes are triangular and 6–8 cm wide and 4–6 cm, overlapping somewhat, with either rose-yellowish raised areas resembline warts on blood-red background or else white warts on a wine-red background. Behind the flowers they have ten scale-like, but fleshy bracts, the lower ones smaller. They overlap in a spiral pattern. Male flowers have 2-loculed anthers, broadly ellipsoid, dehiscent by apical pores; apical cupular body base convex; gynostegium blood red. The female flowers have a concave cupular body base with sterile stamens. Gynostegium stouter than stamens. After blooming, the flower detaches and becomes dark in colour and subsequently decomposes slowly. Even when pollination has failed a fruit will develop for five to seven weeks after the flower has faded and pollination is required to successfully develop viable seeds.

The fruits of the species are berries, shaped like flattened barrel, 6.7–10.2 cm in diameter and 3.1–5 cm long, and weighing 250–375 g. They are covered in cracks as much as 3 cm long and 1 cm deep and dark brown to black. The interior pulp is white with the seeds on membranes within it. The seeds are quite small, just 0.6–0.65 mm long and 0.09–0.13 mm wide. The seeds are largely covered in a hard, dark brown seed coat with a pattern of tiny irregular hexigons. In the wild fruit set is quite low, with just 8–12% of seed flowers producing a fruit in one study. Each mature fruit has around 15,000 seeds.

Sapria is a root parasite and its usual hosts are lianas such as Vitis and Tetrastigma. The flowering shoot is short, erect and unbranched. It has been suggested that flies pollinate it. Indirect evidence shows that the fruits are consumed and the seeds are distributed by rats or squirrels in the wild, with fruits seldom if ever reaching the stage where they naturally split open. Fruits become attractive to rodents after developing for about four months.

== Taxonomy ==
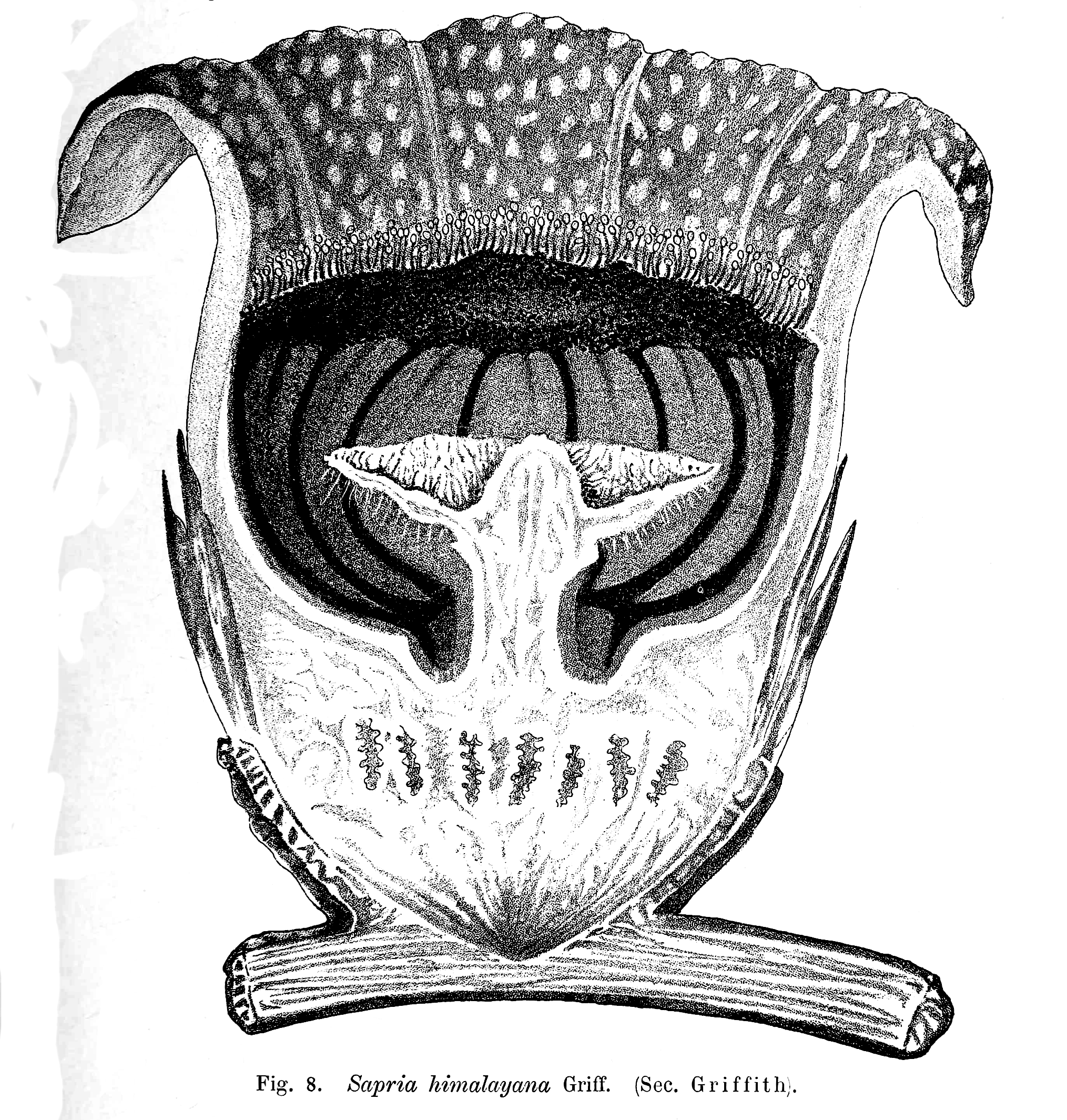
Illustration of flower cut in half

In 1844 botanist William Griffith described a new genus of plants which he named Sapria. In establishing the genus he described one species, Sapria himalayana, though three additional accepted species were later recognized. Together with its genus it is classified in the Rafflesiaceae family and the species has two accepted forms.

- Sapria himalayana f. albovinosa – Native to just the former province of Assam, Myanmar, Thailand, and Vietnam
- Sapria himalayana f. himalayana – Native to the former province of Assam, South Central China, East Himalaya, Myanmar, Thailand, Tibet, and Vietnam

In 1907 Carl Curt Hosseus described and named Richthofenia siamensis, a heterotypic synonym of form himalayana. An superfluous illegitimate name, Sapria griffithiana, was also published for the species in 1844 by Robert Brown.

=== Names ===
Sapria himalayana is frequently called hermit's spittoon, a translation of the Thai name กระโถนฤๅษี (krathon ryssi).

== Distribution ==
Sapria himalayana is native to Assam, East Himalaya, Tibet, South Central China, Myanmar, Thailand, and Vietnam. It has been recorded in Namdapha National Park in Northeast India. In Thailand, it is found in Doi Suthep National Park, Doi Inthanon, Doi Phu Kha National Park, Thung Yai Naresuan Wildlife Sanctuary, Kaeng Krachan National Park in the Tenasserim Hills. It is also found in the Dawna and Karen Hills of Myanmar and in Vietnam. Its natural habitat are evergreen forests at altitudes between 800 and 1,450 metres.

In Vietnam, it is only known from the Lang Biang Plateau, where it has been recorded at Tuyền Lâm Lake, the Nam Ban Protection Forest, and the Cam Ly area.
