= Sapria poilanei =

Conservation status
- Endangered (IUCN 3.1)

Scientific classification
- Kingdom: Plantae
- Clade: Tracheophytes
- Clade: Angiosperms
- Clade: Eudicots
- Clade: Rosids
- Order: Malpighiales
- Family: Rafflesiaceae
- Genus: Sapria
- Species: S. poilanei

Binomial name
- Sapria poilanei Gagnep.

Species of flowering plant

Sapria poilanei is a holoparasitic flowering plant endemic to Cambodia.

H. Bänziger & B. Hansen (1997) consider specimens in Thailand formerly identified as Sapria poilanei to be Sapria ram.
