= Rhizanthes deceptor =

Scientific classification
- Kingdom: Plantae
- Clade: Tracheophytes
- Clade: Angiosperms
- Clade: Eudicots
- Clade: Rosids
- Order: Malpighiales
- Family: Rafflesiaceae
- Genus: Rhizanthes
- Species: R. deceptor

Binomial name
- Rhizanthes deceptor Bänziger, B.Hansen

Species of flowering plant

Rhizanthes deceptor is a species of parasitic flowering plant without leaves, stems, roots, or photosynthetic tissue. They grow on roots of the Tetrastigma vine. They are only found in the tropical forests of Sumatra at 500–700 m. The flowers are white, with red-brown tips, and are from 20 to 27 cm across.
