= Rhizanthes infanticida =

Scientific classification
- Kingdom: Plantae
- Clade: Tracheophytes
- Clade: Angiosperms
- Clade: Eudicots
- Clade: Rosids
- Order: Malpighiales
- Family: Rafflesiaceae
- Genus: Rhizanthes
- Species: R. infanticida

Binomial name
- Rhizanthes infanticida Bänziger, B.Hansen

Species of flowering plant

Rhizanthes infanticida is a species of parasitic flowering plants without leaves, stems, roots, or photosynthetic tissue. They grow on roots of the Tetrastigma vine. They are found in the tropical forests of southern Thailand, western Malaysia, and Sumatra. The brown flowers are from 14 to 22 cm across. The flowers smell like a mammalian carcass and attract flies, which pollinate the blooms while laying their eggs inside. The flies' larvae die due to the lack of nutrients, hence the species name "infanticida".
