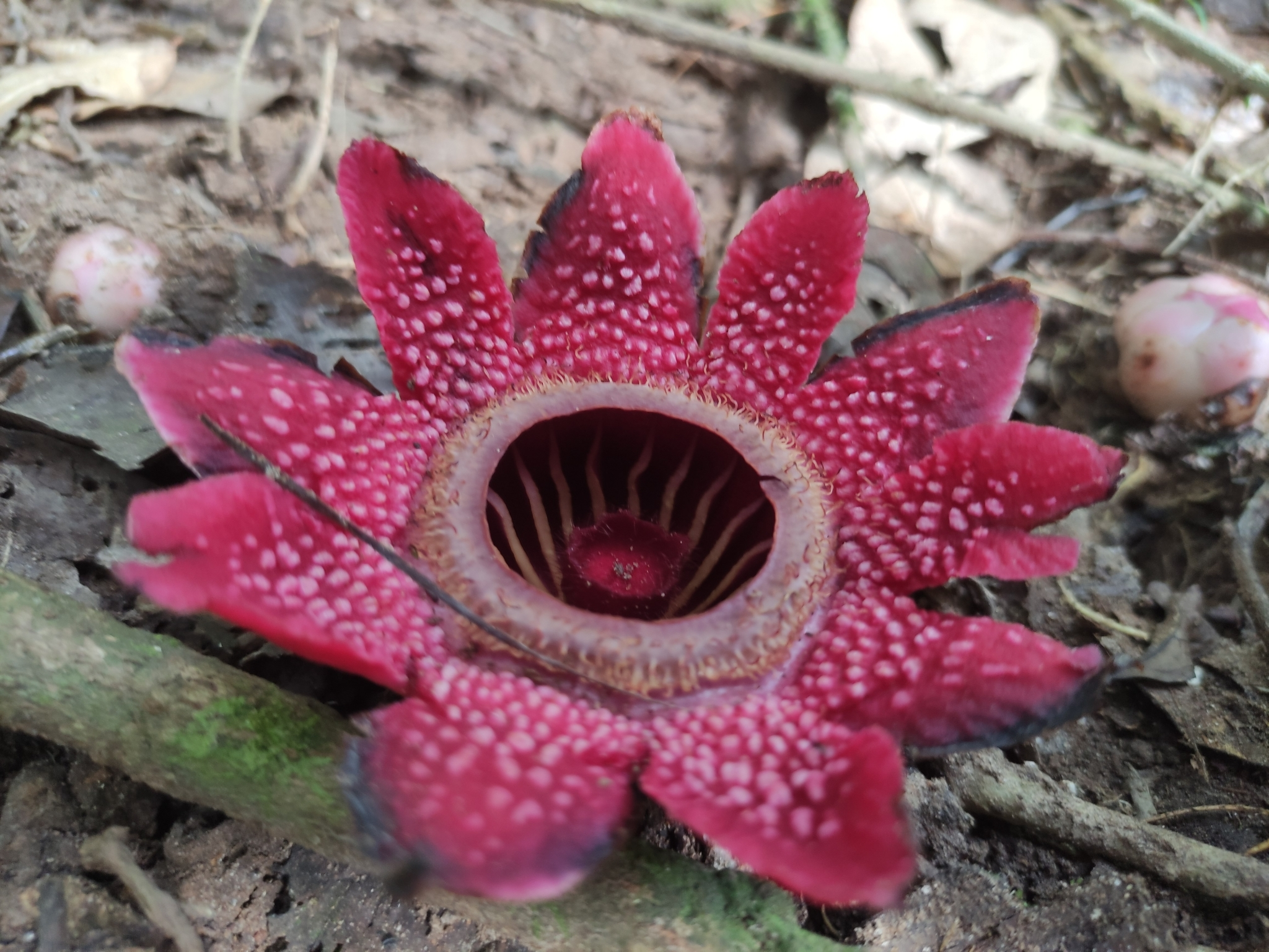

Conservation status
- Endangered (IUCN 3.1)

Scientific classification
- Kingdom: Plantae
- Clade: Tracheophytes
- Clade: Angiosperms
- Clade: Eudicots
- Clade: Rosids
- Order: Malpighiales
- Family: Rafflesiaceae
- Genus: Sapria
- Species: S. ram

Binomial name
- Sapria ram H. Bänziger & B. Hansen

= Sapria ram =

Species of flowering plant

Sapria ram is a holoparasitic flowering plant endemic to Thailand. It is found in central and southern Thailand. H. Bänziger & B. Hansen (1997) consider specimens in Thailand formerly identified as Sapria poilanei (currently considered to be endemic to Cambodia) to be Sapria ram.
