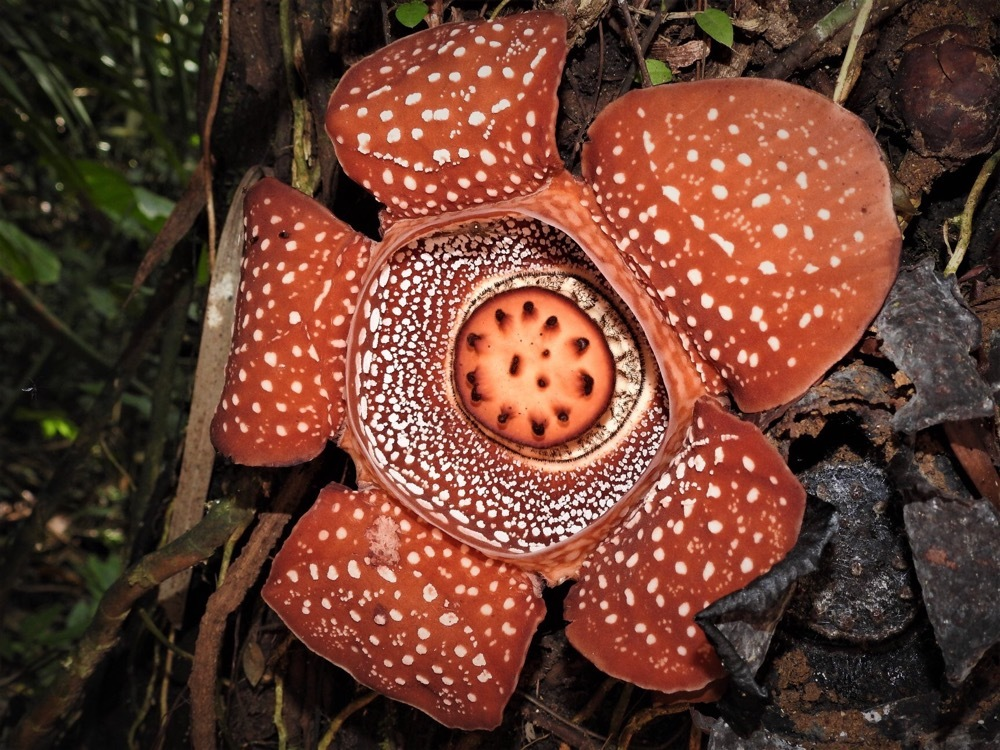
- Open flower showing perigones surrounding diaphragm

Scientific classification
- Kingdom: Plantae
- Clade: Tracheophytes
- Clade: Angiosperms
- Clade: Eudicots
- Clade: Rosids
- Order: Malpighiales
- Family: Rafflesiaceae
- Genus: Rafflesia
- Species: R. lagascae

Binomial name
- Rafflesia lagascae Blanco

Synonyms
- Rafflesia panchoana Madulid, Buot & Agoo

= Rafflesia lagascae =

Malaboô (Tagalog)

Species of flowering plant

Rafflesia lagascae (/rəˈfliːz(i)ə, -ˈfliːʒ(i)ə, ræ-/), named malaboô locally, is a species of flowering plant in the parasitic genus Rafflesia within the family Rafflesiaceae. It is only found growing in the rainforest of the island of Luzon in the Philippines. It is a parasitic plant that grows rather like a fungus, wholly within its host vine, Tetrastigma, and it cannot be seen except when its buds and flowers protrude through the stem or roots of the vine each year. It has no stem, leaves or roots. Plants in the Rafflesia species generally have the nickname "corpse flower" because they attract blowflies seeking carrion.

R. lagascae is the most common Rafflesia species in the Philippines and, compared with other Rafflesia species, it has comparatively small flowers. However, because R. arnoldi (endemic to Indonesia) is famous for having the largest flowers of any plant, people near Manila are willing to take a comparatively easy trek up Mount Makiling in the hope of finding a somewhat similar plant in flower. The diameter of R. lagascae's flower is 11 to 24 centimetres (4 to 9 inches) compared with R. arnoldi at up to 150 cm (59 in).

== Description ==
The flowers of the species R. lagascae (the species name R. panchoana is also used) are similar in appearance to those of R. manillana that is now regarded as a different species. Confusingly, before 2013, specimens of R. lagascae were often described as R. manillana. The plant is an obligate endo-holoparasite. (Note: obligate endo-holoparasite: "obligate" means it requires a host at some stage in its lifecycle; "endo-" means it develops entirely within the tissue of the host (except for flowering); "holoparasite" (often used as a synonym for "obligate parasite") means it derives all its fixed carbon from the host and in this case lacks any means for producing chlorophyll.)

=== Pollination ===
Rafflesia species flowers generally have a strong fetid smell, hence the name "corpse flower", and they attract carrion flies for pollination. Although there are some reports of R. lagascae having a foul or pungent smell, such claims do not seem to be confirmed (or denied) in the scientific literature. (Note: When asked "Are there scientific reports of the species Rafflesia lagascae having a strong smell?", ChatGPT gave a detailed response with the conclusion "Although Rafflesia lagascae is presumed to employ carrion mimicry like other members of the genus, there are currently no published scientific studies characterizing the intensity or chemical composition of its floral scent."^{[original research?]}) Many species of blow flies are attracted to the plant, entering and leaving the floral chamber. The metallic blue blow fly is the most common visitor but also a red-eyed flesh fly (probably a species of Sarcophagidae that deposits its maggots in the perigone), the greenish-blue fly (Lucilia fumicosta), the common housefly and vinegar fly have all been recorded.

=== Floral development ===
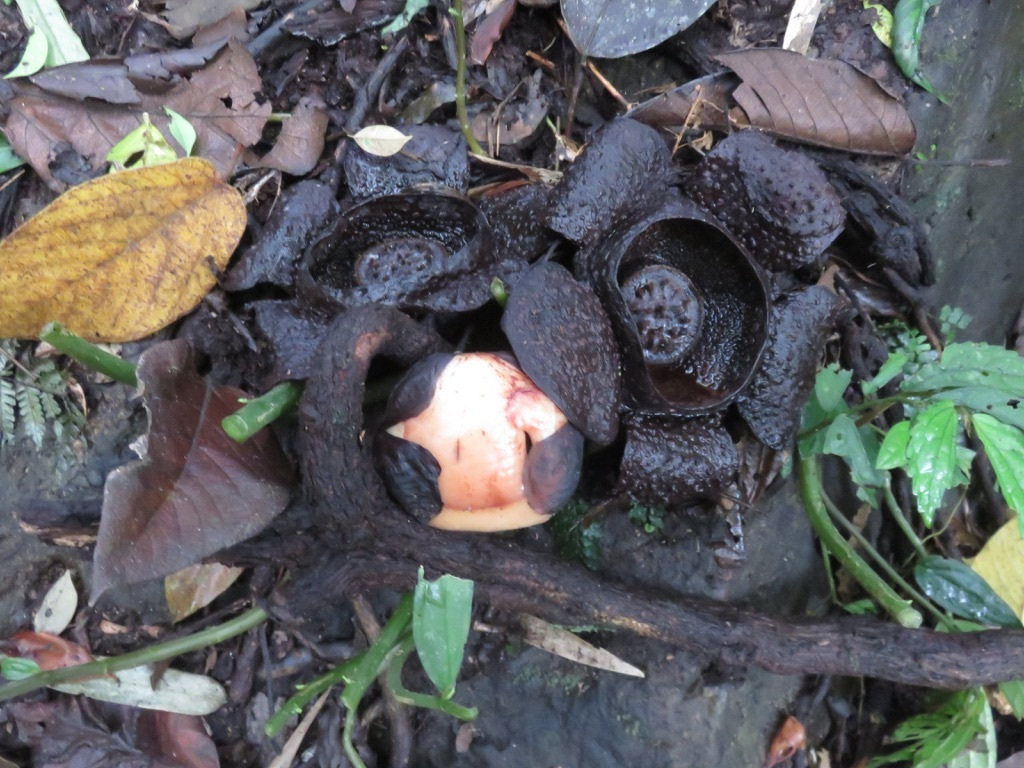
Dead flowers and bud about to sprout

Tetrastigma is a genus of liana vine that is the only host that R. lagascae parasitizes. After growing in the form of threads wholly within the vine, i.e. as an endophyte, R. lagascae emerges from the vine's stem or roots to flower. (Note: Roots are primarily involved and flowers more commonly develop on the ground.) When coming from a root of the host vine, it can appear to be growing directly out of the ground. R. lagascae itself has no roots, stem or leaves but it produces a spectacular flower each year between February and May with each flower lasting "a couple of days". Compared with other Rafflesia species, R. lagascae has comparatively small flowers, about 11 to 24 centimetres (4 to 9 in) in diameter. (Note: R. arnoldi can have a diameter of up to 150 centimetres (59 in).) The buds grow to 6.5 to 8 cm (2.6 to 3.1 in) in diameter and start flowering some 12 to 24 hours apart. A flower takes 15 to 17 hours to fully open with different perigone lobes growing at different periods within this interval. During the first 11 hours the perigone lobes develop directly away from the bud and then curve obliquely to open outwards.

=== Morphology ===
When R. lagascae is in flower, a perigone tube emerges directly from the host Tetrastigma to form the floral chamber. It is reddish brown and densely covered with wart-like white spots on its inner surface. At the top of the chamber the perigone branches out into five lobes producing a flower 14 to 24 centimetres (5.5 to 9.4 in) across, similarly coloured but with fewer, larger white spots, and looking like fleshy petals. Also from the top of the chamber a ring-like diaphragm extends inwards to partially cover the top of the chamber but leaving a 7 cm (2.8 in) circular opening into the inside of the chamber. The interior of the ring-like diaphragm and interior perigone tube are covered in hairs (ramenta) and there are also smooth whitish "windows". From the foot of the chamber rises a central column capped by a tan-coloured disk with dark, horn-like processes on top. Around the disk's underside are the reproductive organs, either anthers or a stigmatic belt.

According to Pieter Pelser et al., the plant is probably monoecious, having both male and female flowers. Also, flowers of different plants (i.e. of different genotypes) can be found emerging from the same vine stem.

=== Seed dispersal ===
After flowering, the plant produces a brown, dome-shaped indehiscent berry (c. 6.5 cm × 5.5 cm (2.6 in × 2.2 in)) that decays to release thousands of tiny seeds. A wide variety of creatures take these seeds away and ants have been seen removing them. (Note: The ants were species of Technomyrmex and Pheidologeton. Other animals observed taking seèds were (for R. philippensis) the large treeshrew and plantain squirrel.) Pelser speculates that when seeds germinate underground in ants' nests they may infect nearby Tetrastigma roots.

=== Cell biology ===
Although Jeanmaire Molina et al. were able to sequence the mitochondrial genome of R. lagascae from the DNA of one of its buds, they were unable to find more than fragmentary plastid genome sequences, or anything at all of a chloroplast genome. They considered Rafflesia might be the first plant group to have no plastid genome for chlorophyll production.

== Distribution and habitat ==
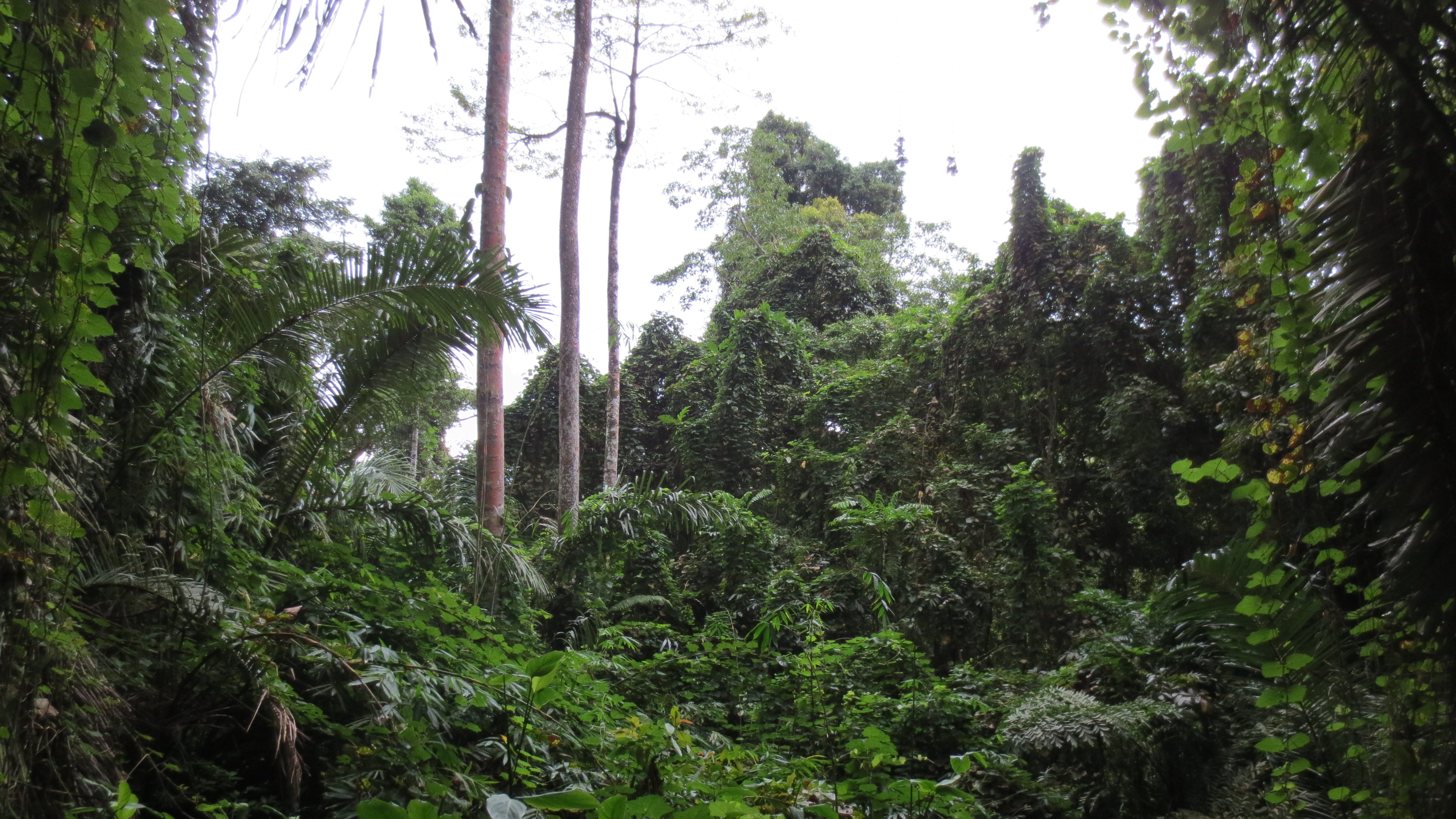
Opening in the Mount Makiling rainforest

Rafflesia lagascae, or malaboô in the local Tagalog language, is endemic to the tropical rainforest of the island of Luzon in the Philippines where it is the most common species of Rafflesia. In a series of studies covering 36 sites it grew at elevations of 500–1,000 metres (1,600–3,300 ft) (Note: It is reported to have been found overall from 50–1,110 metres (160–3,640 ft).) where precipitation is 2,500–3,000 millimetres (100–120 in) per year and where the mean daily temperature is 21–24 °C (70–75 °F) and fairly constant over the seasons. The area where the habitat is considered suitable for the species covers about 32% of Luzon and in Protected Areas about 68.0% is suitable. Such a habitat exists in many areas of southeast Asia but R. lagascae is only found on Luzon island and only in 12 quite limited areas that are widely separated across the island from north to south.

The plant parasitizes only three species of Tetrastigma vine (T. ellipticum, T. loheri, and T. sp. A (sensu Pelser et al.), which are widely distributed over all three island groups of the Philippines. There are various suggestions as to why R. lagascae is so restricted in location and these theories are, somewhat in order of increasing likelihood: the plants do not bloom and are undetected; there are unconsidered environmental constraints; there are undiscovered genetic effects between host and parasite; there is very localised distribution of seeds. Ants may be the main distributors of seeds (myrmecochory) and normally only take seeds as far away as 10–80 metres (33–260 ft).

Because R. lagascae is only found at a small number of limited locations it is considered a vulnerable species.

A particularly accessible location is within the Makiling Forest Reserve beside the campus of the University of the Philippines Los Baños, near Manila. Comparatively recently a tourist attraction has been promoted for taking a day-long trek up Mount Makiling from the University campus, near Manila. (Note: As of 2026 the university's Makiling Center for Mountain Ecosystems has taken over the management of the Forest Reserve and entry is strictly controlled. An official guide must be employed, physical identity evidence is required to be deposited for return on exit and times of entry and exit are enforced strictly. R. lagascae may be in bloom on rare occasions between February and May. Blossoms may be photographed but not approached or touched.) Flowering plants have also been found at Apayao at the north of Luzon.

== Taxonomy ==
Rafflesia Lagacae was first described by Manuel Blanco in his "Flora de Filipinas", in 1845. It is named after Stamford Raffles and Mariano Lagasca. Its taxonomic status has been subject to much debate but it has recently become officially regarded as a different species from R. manillana, and synonymous with R. panchoana. (Note: Citations to papers discussing the changing taxonomy.)

== Conservation ==
Although most species of Rafflesia are at risk of extinction, only one, Rafflesia magnifica, has been included on the IUCN Red List (Critically Endangered).

R. lagascae has been found in an increasing number of locations on Luzon and officials say this demonstrates the healthy and undisturbed ecoystem, with sustained forestry and lack of illegal logging. Rafflesia discoveries have encouraged ecotourism so visitor access may need to be controlled to preserve rare species. However, in 2009, Julie Barcelona wrote that deforestation in the Philippines has continued since the 1950s despite official denials with a decline to 6.6% of the primary forest cover expected by 2010. The lowland forest habitat inhabited by Rafflesia was particularly vulnerable.

Attempts have been made to conserve R. lagascae by collecting infected Tetrastigma vines and using them for grafting. However, such methods have not been successful. Seeds of R. keithii have been successfully used to inoculate host vines at Sabah, in Malaysian Borneo.
