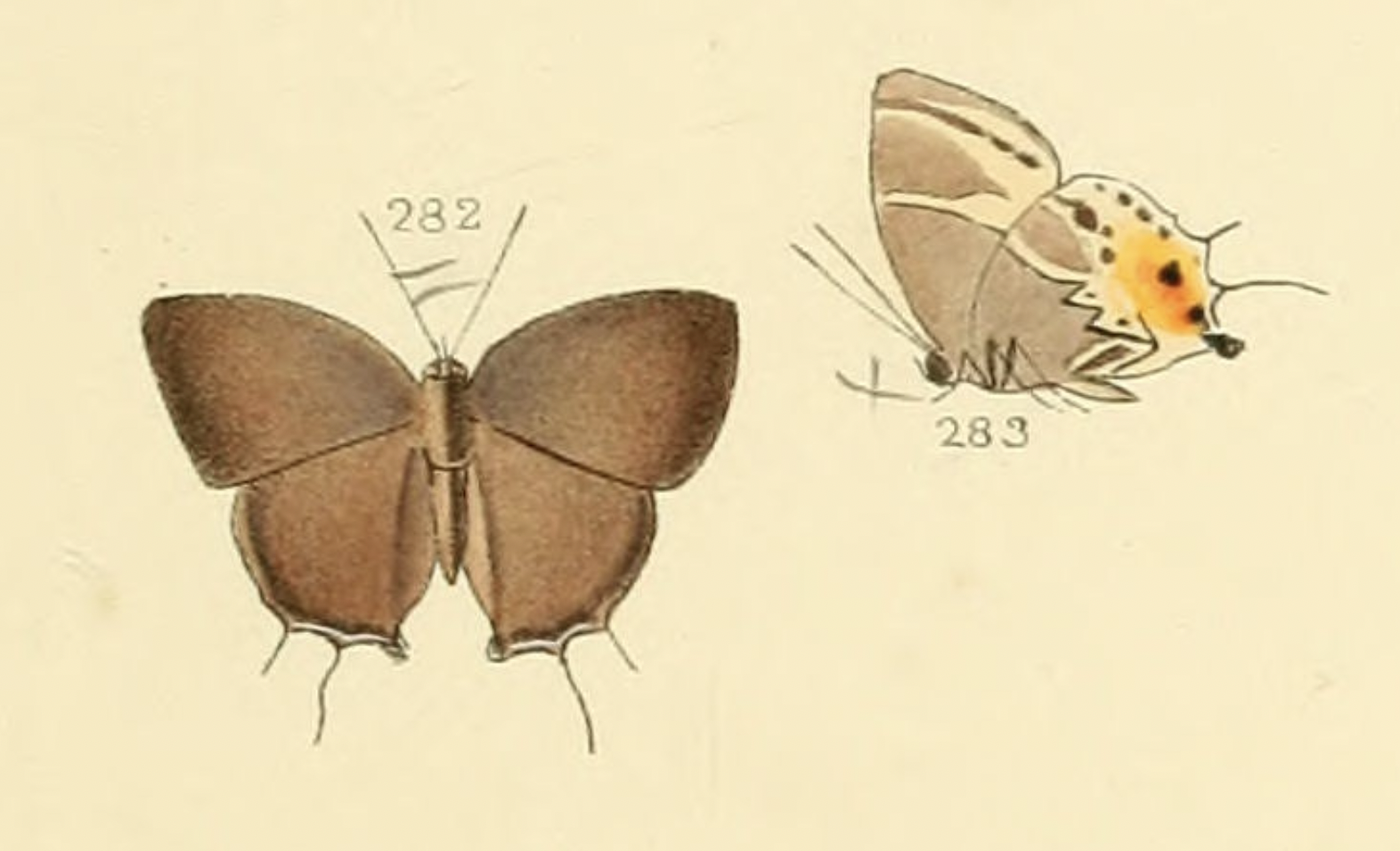

Scientific classification
- Kingdom: Animalia
- Phylum: Arthropoda
- Clade: Pancrustacea
- Class: Insecta
- Order: Lepidoptera
- Family: Lycaenidae
- Genus: Terenthina
- Species: T. terentia

Binomial name
- Terenthina terentia Hewitson, 1868

= Terenthina terentia =

Species of butterfly

Terenthina terentia, the Terentia hairstreak, is a species of butterfly in the family Lycaenidae. It was described by William Chapman Hewitson in 1868 and is found in Central and South America in habitats including rainforests and cloud forests.

== Ecology ==
The Terentia hairstreak's larval stage is a fuzzy caterpillar that feeds on the flower buds of parasitic plants in the stemsucker family Apodanthaceae which is a parasite on the tree Casearia. In addition, the larvae have a form of symbiosis with ants. The caterpillars produce a sweet-tasting liquid containing sugars and amino acids. The ants use physical stimulation to cause the caterpillar to secrete the solution and in return for this food source, the ants provide the caterpillars with protection from predators. The adult butterfly has markings on its wings that look similar to the flower buds in color and shape. Adults feed on nectar from various flowering plants including members of the family Asteraceae. This creates a set of interactions like the one below:

Casearia → Apodanthaceae (parasitism) → T. terentia (sugary liquid) → Ants
