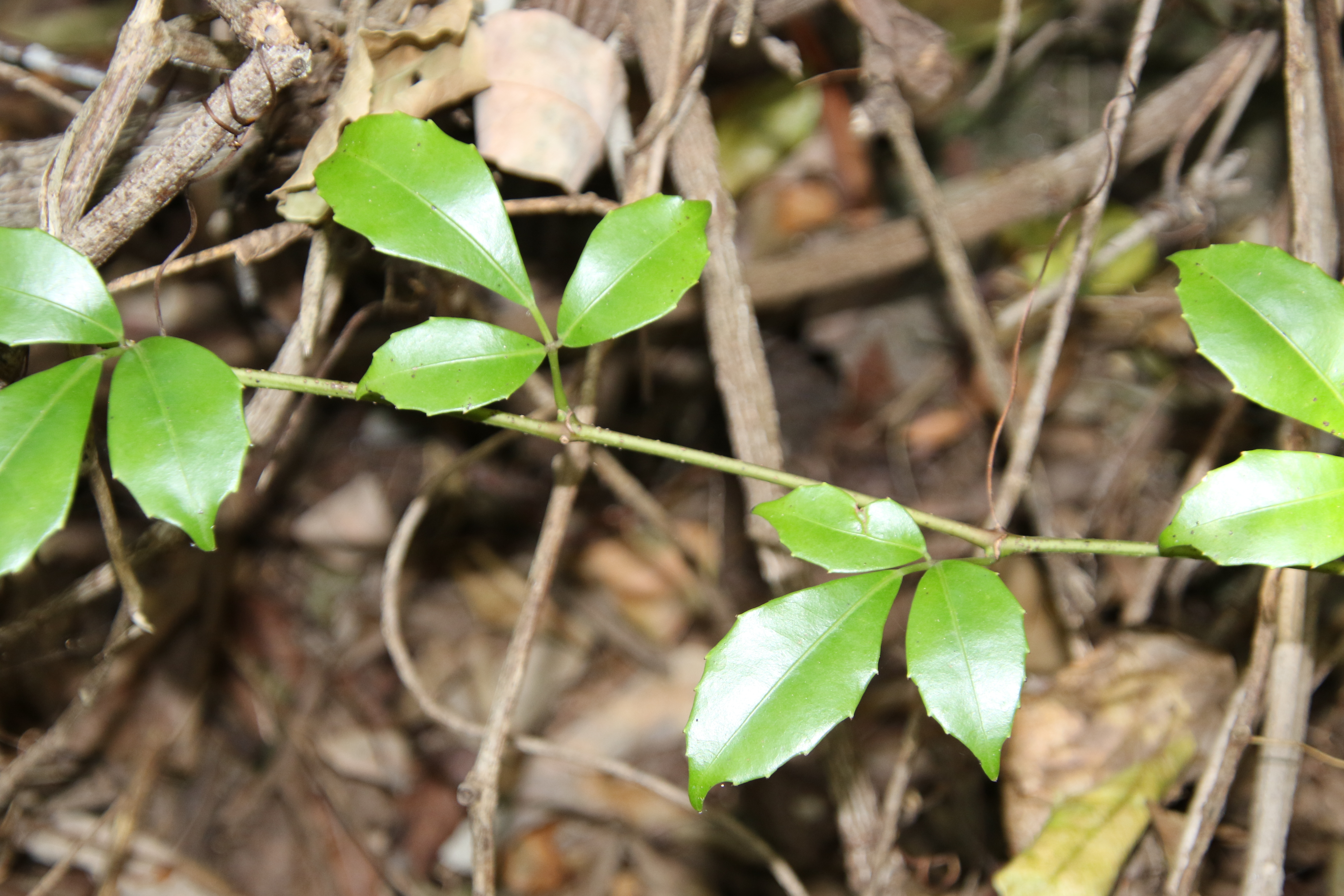
- Watagans National Park, Australia

Scientific classification
- Kingdom: Plantae
- Clade: Tracheophytes
- Clade: Angiosperms
- Clade: Eudicots
- Clade: Rosids
- Order: Vitales
- Family: Vitaceae
- Genus: Tetrastigma
- Species: T. nitens

Binomial name
- Tetrastigma nitens (F.Muell.) Planch.

= Tetrastigma nitens =

Species of vine

Tetrastigma nitens is a species of liana native to seasonal tropical forests and gallery forests of tropical and subtropical eastern Australia.

Common names include native grape, shiny-leaved grape, and three-leaf water vine.
