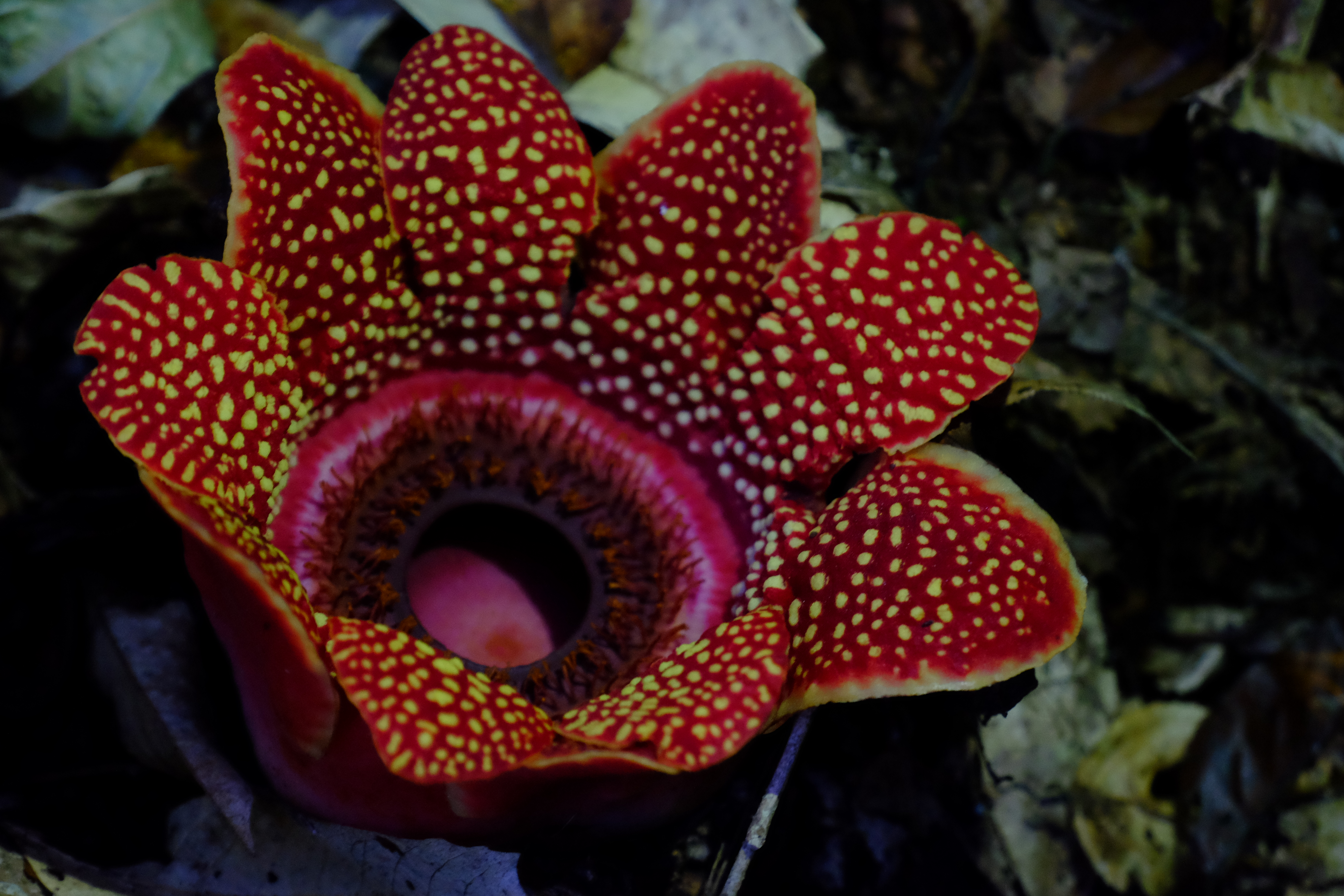
- Sapria himalayana

Scientific classification
- Kingdom: Plantae
- Clade: Tracheophytes
- Clade: Angiosperms
- Clade: Eudicots
- Clade: Rosids
- Order: Malpighiales
- Family: Rafflesiaceae
- Genus: Sapria; Griff.

Species
- Sapria himalayana Griff.; Sapria myanmarensis Nob.Tanaka, Nagam., Tagane & M.M.Aung; Sapria poilanei Gagnep.; Sapria ram Bänziger & B.Hansen

= Sapria =

Genus of flowering plants

Sapria is an Asian genus of parasitic flowering plants in the family Rafflesiaceae erected by William Griffith in 1844. It grows within roots of Vitis and Tetrastigma. The genus is limited to the tropical forests of South and Southeast Asia.

The flowers of Sapria are about 20 cm in diameter, bright red with yellow or white dots, unisexual and dioecious. In contrast with the related genus Rafflesia, the flowers have 10 lobes.

== Species ==
Four species are described.

Image	Scientific name	Distribution
	Sapria himalayana	found in Tibet, Assam in northeast India, South-Central China, Myanmar, Thailand and Vietnam.
	Sapria poilanei	found in Cambodia.
	Sapria ram	found in central and southern Thailand.
	Sapria myanmarensis	first described in 2019, is native to Myanmar.
