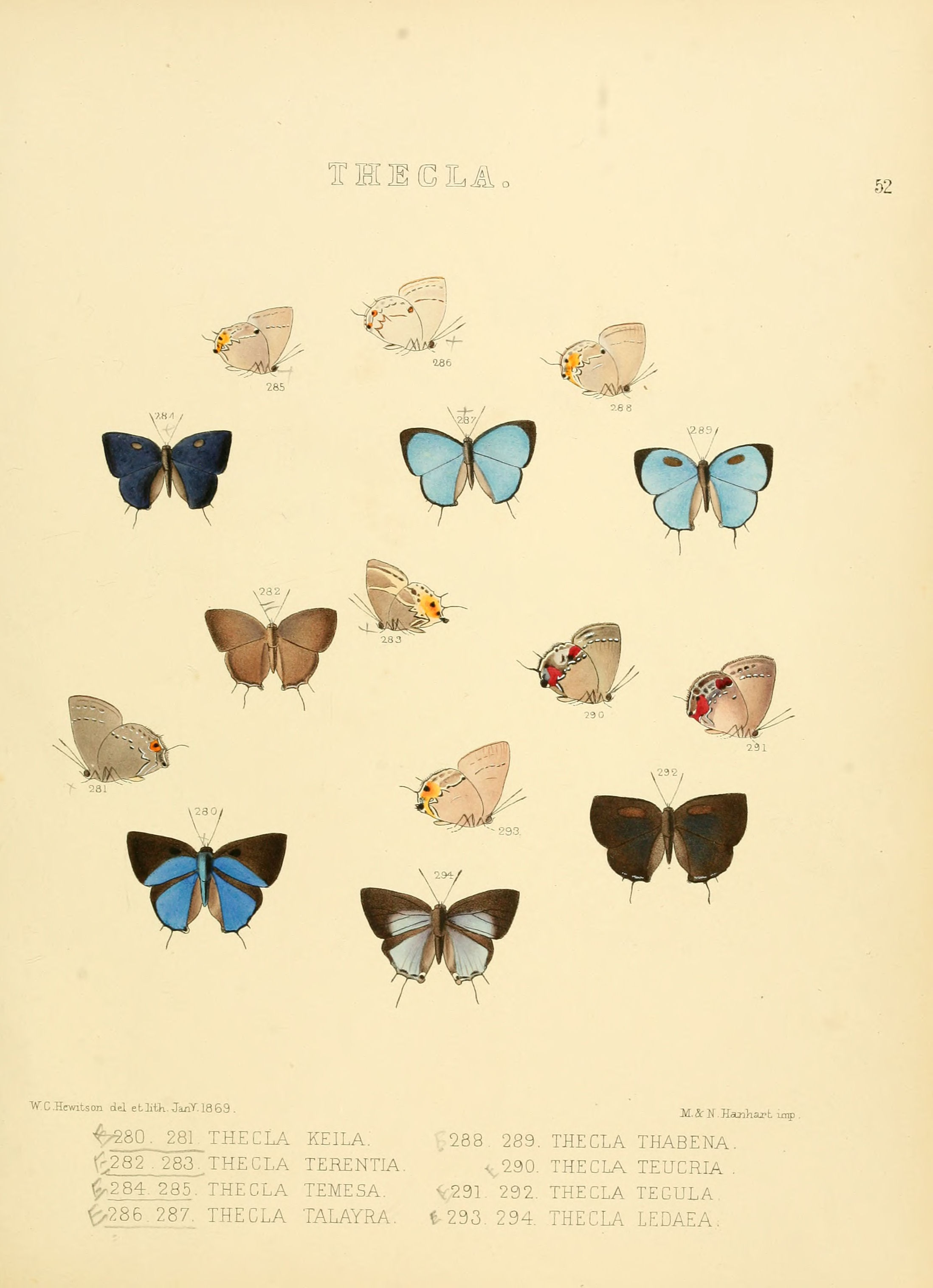
- Terenthina terentia, figures 282 and 283

Scientific classification
- Domain: Eukaryota
- Kingdom: Animalia
- Phylum: Arthropoda
- Class: Insecta
- Order: Lepidoptera
- Family: Lycaenidae
- Tribe: Eumaeini
- Genus: Terenthina; Robbins, 2004

= Terenthina =

Butterfly genus in family Lycaenidae

Terenthina is a Neotropical genus of butterflies in the family Lycaenidae.

== Species ==
- Terenthina terentia (Hewitson, 1868)
- Terenthina bradyae (D'Abrera, 1995)
