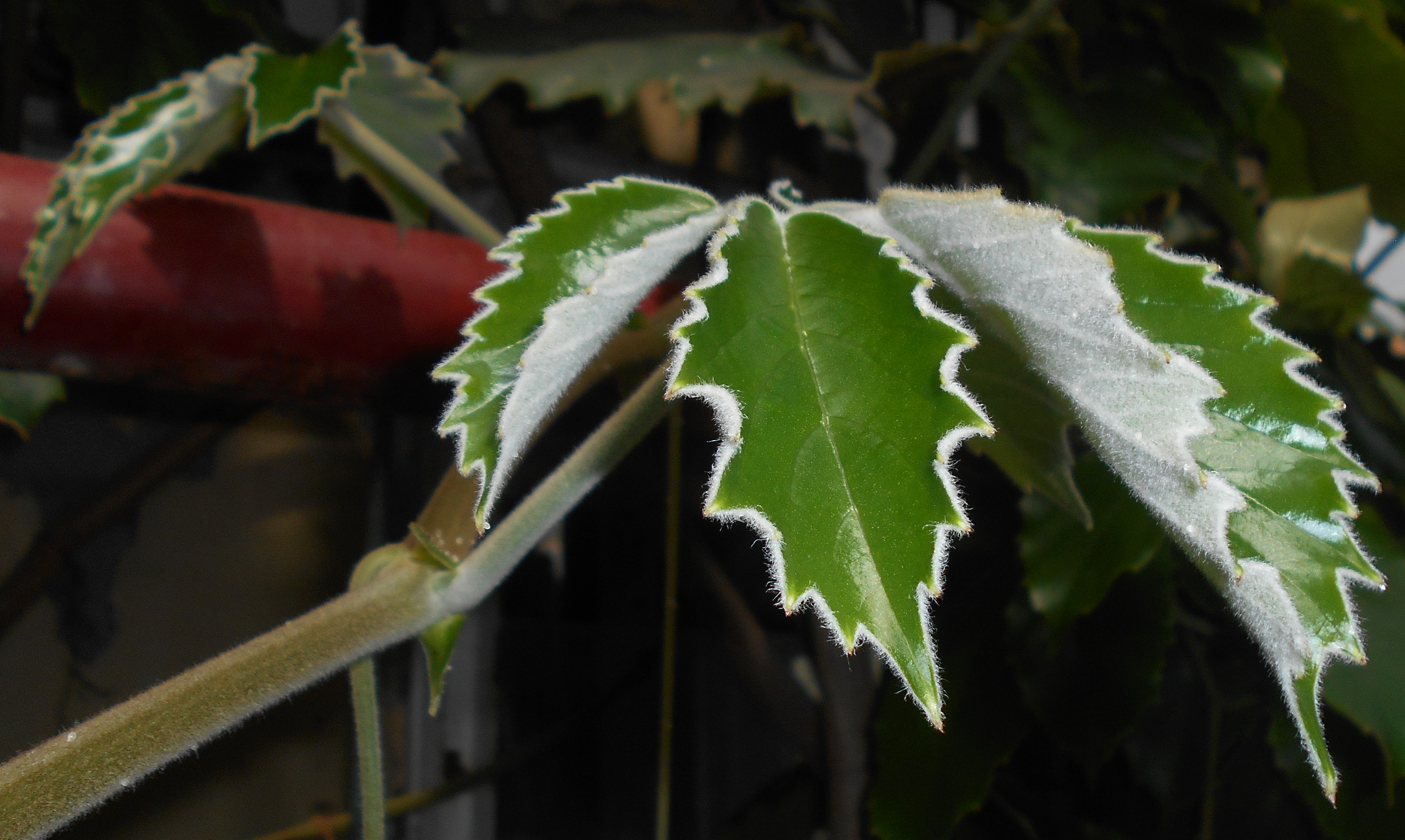

Scientific classification
- Kingdom: Plantae
- Clade: Tracheophytes
- Clade: Angiosperms
- Clade: Eudicots
- Clade: Rosids
- Order: Vitales
- Family: Vitaceae
- Genus: Tetrastigma
- Species: T. voinierianum

Binomial name
- Tetrastigma voinierianum (Sallier) Pierre ex Gagnep.

Synonyms
- List: Cissus voinieriana (Sallier) Viala & Vermorel; Vitis voinieriana Sallier

= Tetrastigma voinierianum =

Species of plant in the genus Tetrastigma

Tetrastigma voinierianum, called chestnut vine and lizard plant, is a species of flowering plant in the genus Tetrastigma, native to Laos and Vietnam, and introduced in Hawaii. It has gained the Royal Horticultural Society's Award of Garden Merit as a hothouse ornamental.
