= Emil Johann Lambert Heinricher =

Austrian botanist (1856–1934)

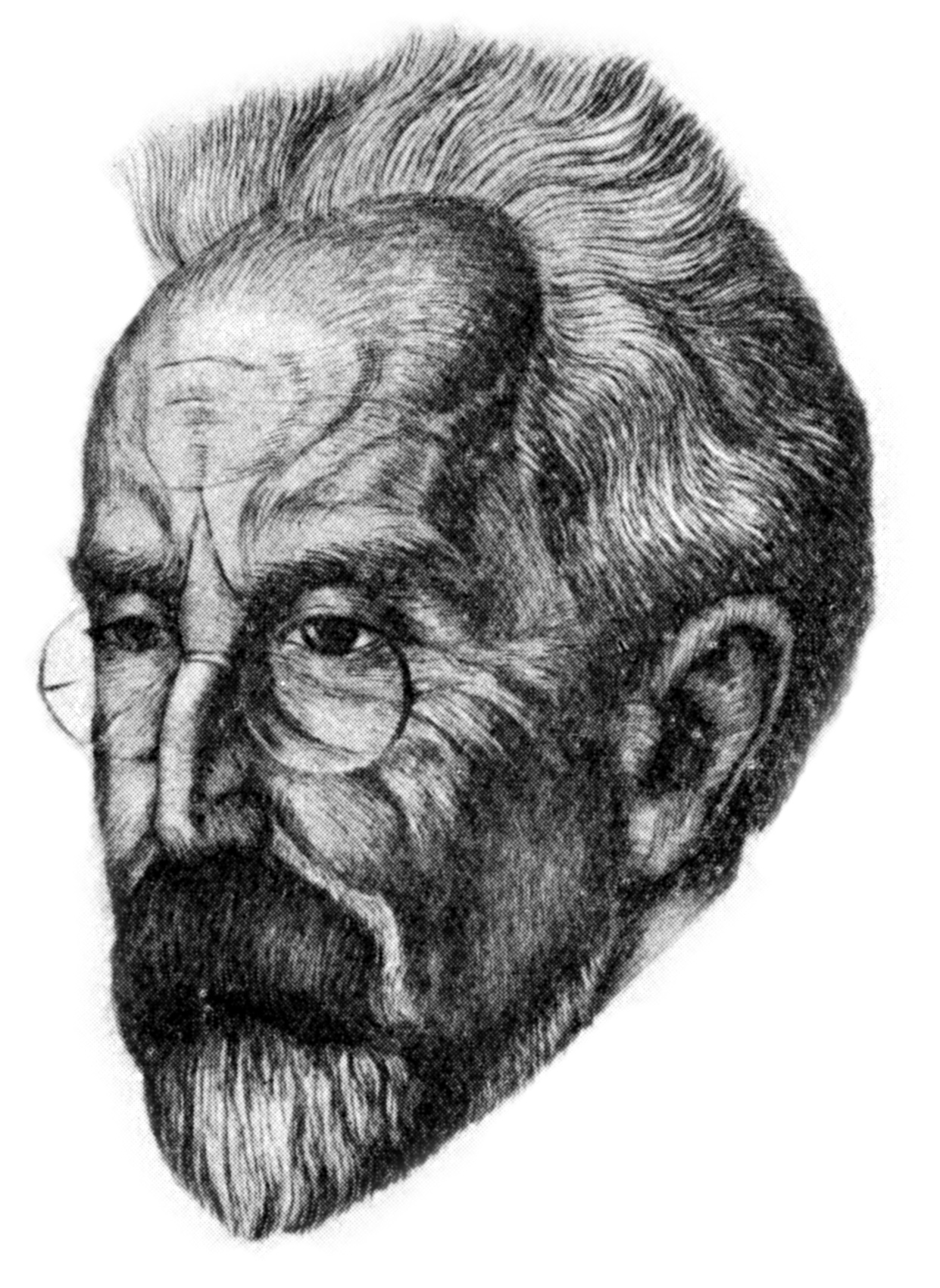
- Emil Johann Lambert Heinricher
- Born: 14 November 1856; Laibach (Ljubljana)
- Died: 13 July 1934 (aged 77)
- Education: University of Graz (Ph.D., 1879)
- Known for: Research on parasitic spermatophytes, toothwort, and mistletoe species
- Scientific career
- Fields: Botany
- Institutions: University of Graz, University of Innsbruck
- Thesis: (1879)
- Doctoral advisor: Hubert Leitgeb
- Author abbrev. (botany): Heinr.

Emil Johann Lambert Heinricher (14 November 1856 – 13 July 1934) was an Austrian botanist from Laibach (Ljubljana).

In 1879 he received his doctorate from the University of Graz, where after graduation, he served as an assistant to botanist Hubert Leitgeb. In 1889 he became an associate professor of botany, which was followed by a full professorship at the University of Innsbruck in 1891. While at Innsbruck, he created a new botanical garden in nearby Hötting. Through support from the Austrian Academy of Sciences, he took part in a study trip to Java (1903/04). While there, he spent time working at the Buitenzorg Botanical Gardens (now the Bogor Botanical Gardens).

He is known for his research pertaining to the morphology, developmental history, ecology and physiology of parasitic spermatophytes. He performed detailed studies of toothwort and mistletoe species, including investigations of pear tree immunity in regards to mistletoe.

Heinricher also conducted studies on flower construction anomalies and their importance in understanding its phylogenetics, adventitious buds on the frond lamina of ferns from an evolutionary and morphological perspective, the effects of light and substrate on seed germination and isolateral leaf construction in plants being exposed to strong sunlight.

Heinricher's grandson, Meinhard Michael Moser (1924–2002), was an esteemed mycologist.

== Selected writings ==
- Die Aufzucht und Kultur der parasitischen Samenpflanzen, 1910 - The development and culture of parasitic seed plants.
- Der Kampf zwischen Mistel und Birbaum. Immune, unecht immune und nicht immune Birnrassen; immunwerden für das Mistelgift früher sehr empfindlicher Bäume nach dem Überstehen einer ersten Infektion. 1917 - The struggle between mistletoe and pear trees, etc.
- Monographie der Gattung Lathraea, 1931 - Monograph of the genus Lathraea.
- Geschichte des Botanischen Gartens der Universät Innsbruck, 1934 - History on the botanical gardens at the University of Innsbruck.
