= Antho- =

Prefix

Antho- is a prefix derived from the Ancient Greek ἄνθος (anthos) meaning “flower”.

It is found in words such as :

- Anthomania, an obsession with flowers
- Anthocyanins, a class of phenolic pigments found in plants
- Anthodite, a type of cave formations composed of long needle-like crystals situated in clusters which radiate outward from a common base
- Anthology
- Anthotype, a photographic process using plant and flower material
- Anthozoa, a class within the phylum Cnidaria that contains the sea anemones and corals
- Anthomedusae (a.k.a. Anthoathecatae), an order of marine invertebrates
- Anthocerotophyta, the hornworts, a division of non-vascular plants
- Anthocoridae, the minute pirate bugs or flower bugs, a family of bugs
- Anthochori, Arcadia, a former settlement in Greece
- Anthophyta, the anthophytes, ancestors of modern flowering plants

== See also ==
- Anthos (disambiguation)
- Anthus (mythology)
