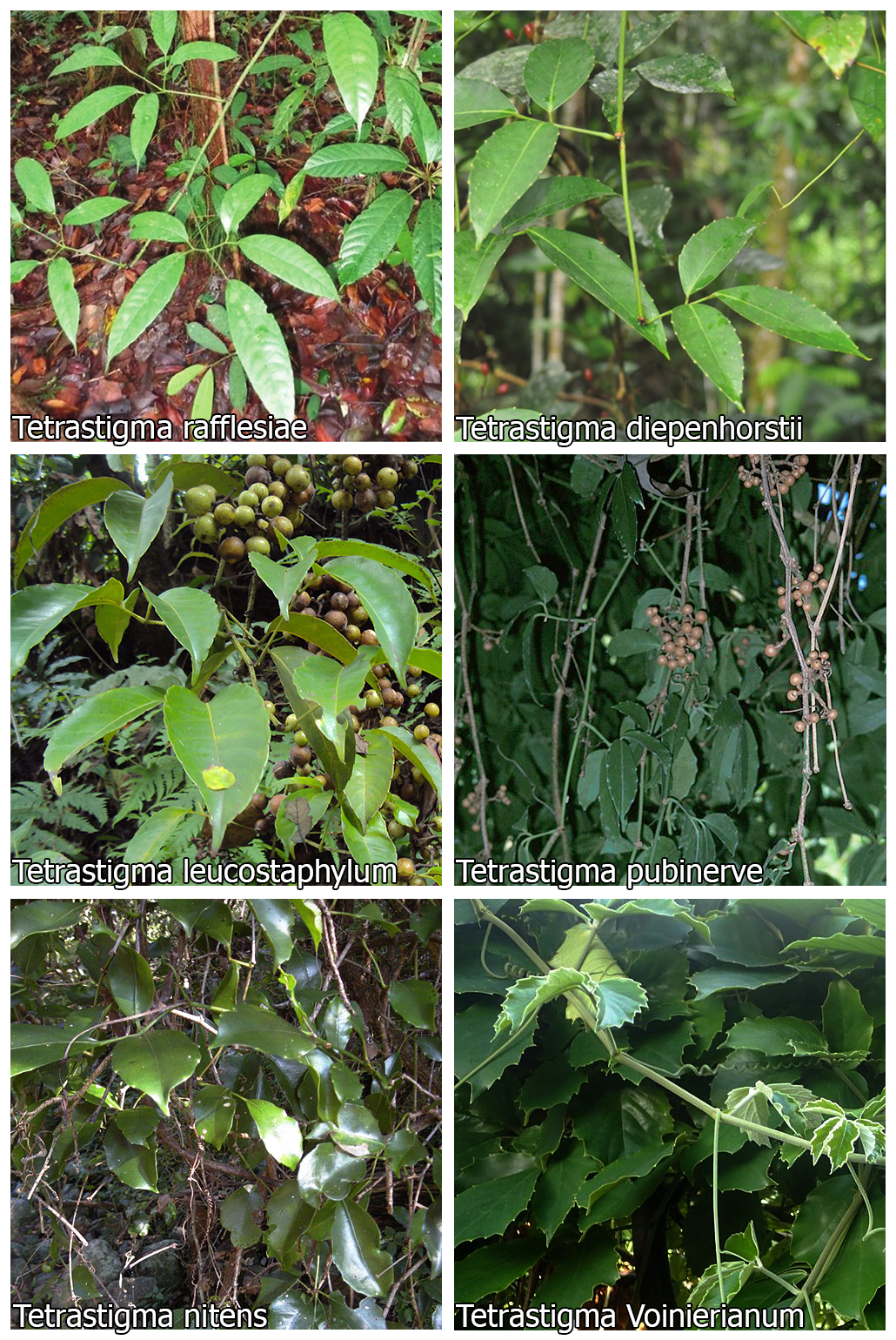
- Some Tetrastigma species

Scientific classification
- Kingdom: Plantae
- Clade: Tracheophytes
- Clade: Angiosperms
- Clade: Eudicots
- Clade: Rosids
- Order: Vitales
- Family: Vitaceae
- Tribe: Cayratieae
- Genus: Tetrastigma (Miq.) Planch.

= Tetrastigma =

Genus of woody vines

Tetrastigma is a genus of plants in the grape family, Vitaceae. The plants are lianas that climb with tendrils and have palmately compound leaves. Plants are dioecious, with separate male and female plants; female flowers are characterized by their four-lobed stigmas. The species are found in subtropical and tropical regions of Asia, Malesia, and Australia, where they grow in primary rainforest, gallery forest and monsoon forest and moister woodland. Species of this genus are notable as being the sole hosts of parasitic plants in the family Rafflesiaceae, one of which, Rafflesia arnoldii, produces the largest single flower in the world. Tetrastigma is the donor species for horizontal gene transfer to Sapria and Rafflesia due to multiple gene theft events.

Within the Vitaceae, Tetrastigma has long been considered closely related to Cayratia and Cyphostemma and is now placed in the tribe Cayratieae.

== Fossil record ==
A fossil seed fragment from the early Miocene of Tetrastigma sp., has been found in the Czech part of the Zittau Basin. Tetrastigma macrofossils have been recovered from the late Zanclean stage of Pliocene sites in Pocapaglia, Italy.

== Etymology ==
Tetrastigma is derived from Greek and means 'four stigmas', in reference to its four-lobed stigma.

== Species ==
As of November 2026, Plants of the World Online (POWO) accepts the following 138 species:

- Tetrastigma amboinense (Miq.) Planch.
- Tetrastigma andamanicum (King) Suess.
- Tetrastigma angustifolium (Roxb.) Planch.
- Tetrastigma annamense Gagnep.
- Tetrastigma apiculatum Gagnep.
- Tetrastigma aplinianum (Collett & Hemsl.) Momiy.
- Tetrastigma articulatum (Miq.) Planch.
- Tetrastigma assimile (Kurz) C.L.Li ex Kochaiph. & Trias-Blasi
- Tetrastigma backanense Gagnep.
- Tetrastigma bambusetorum Craib
- Tetrastigma beauvaisii Gagnep.
- Tetrastigma bracteolatum (Wall.) Planch.
- Tetrastigma brunneum Merr.
- Tetrastigma burmanicum (Collett & Hemsl.) Momiy.
- Tetrastigma calcicola Kochaiph. & Trias-Blasi
- Tetrastigma cambodianum Pierre ex Gagnep.
- Tetrastigma campylocarpum (Kurz) Planch.
- Tetrastigma caudatum Merr. & Chun
- Tetrastigma cauliflorum Merr.
- Tetrastigma ceratopetalum C.Y.Wu
- Tetrastigma chapaense Merr.
- Tetrastigma clementis Merr.
- Tetrastigma coriaceum (DC.) Gagnep.
- Tetrastigma corniculatum Merr.
- Tetrastigma crenatum Jackes
- Tetrastigma cruciatum Craib & Gagnep.
- Tetrastigma curtisii (Ridl.) Suess.
- Tetrastigma delavayi Gagnep.
- Tetrastigma dichotomum (Miq.) Planch.
- Tetrastigma diepenhorstii (Miq.) Latiff
- Tetrastigma dubium (M.A.Lawson) Planch.
- Tetrastigma eberhardtii Gagnep.
- Tetrastigma ellipticum Merr.
- Tetrastigma enervium Ridl.
- Tetrastigma erubescens Planch.
- Tetrastigma everettii Merr.
- Tetrastigma formosanum (Hemsl.) Gagnep.
- Tetrastigma fruticosum Soulad., Phonep. & Tagane
- Tetrastigma funingense C.L.Li
- Tetrastigma gamblei B.V.Shetty & P.Singh
- Tetrastigma gaudichaudianum Planch.
- Tetrastigma gibbosum Lauterb.
- Tetrastigma gilgianum Lauterb.
- Tetrastigma harmandii Planch.
- Tetrastigma havilandii Ridl.
- Tetrastigma hemsleyanum Diels & Gilg
- Tetrastigma heterophyllum Gagnep.
- Tetrastigma hookeri Planch.
- Tetrastigma hypoglaucum Planch.
- Tetrastigma jaichagunii C.L.Li ex Kochaiph. & Trias-Blasi
- Tetrastigma jingdongense C.L.Li
- Tetrastigma jinghongense C.L.Li
- Tetrastigma jinxiuense C.L.Li
- Tetrastigma kwangsiense C.L.Li
- Tetrastigma laevigatum (Blume) Gagnep.
- Tetrastigma lanyuense C.E.Chang
- Tetrastigma latiffii Veldkamp
- Tetrastigma lauterbachianum Gilg
- Tetrastigma laxum Merr.
- Tetrastigma lenticellatum C.Y.Wu
- Tetrastigma leucostaphylum (Dennst.) Alston
- Tetrastigma lincangense C.L.Li
- Tetrastigma lineare W.T.Wang ex C.Y.Wu & C.L.Li
- Tetrastigma littorale Merr.
- Tetrastigma liukiuense T.Yamaz.
- Tetrastigma loheri Gagnep.
- Tetrastigma longipedunculatum C.L.Li
- Tetrastigma longisepalum Gagnep.
- Tetrastigma macrocorymbum Gagnep. ex J.Wen, Boggan & Turland
- Tetrastigma magnum Merr.
- Tetrastigma megacarpum Latiff
- Tetrastigma mindanaense Merr.
- Tetrastigma mutabile (Blume) Planch.
- Tetrastigma nilagiricum (Miq.) B.V.Shetty
- Tetrastigma nitens (F.Muell.) Planch.
- Tetrastigma obovatum Gagnep.
- Tetrastigma obtectum (Wall. ex M.A.Lawson) Planch. ex Franch.
- Tetrastigma oliviforme Planch.
- Tetrastigma pachyphyllum (Hemsl.) Chun
- Tetrastigma papillatum (Hance) C.Y.Wu
- Tetrastigma papillosum (Blume) Planch.
- Tetrastigma papuanum (Miq.) Planch.
- Tetrastigma pedunculare (Wall. ex M.A.Lawson) Planch.
- Tetrastigma pergamaceum (Blume) Planch.
- Tetrastigma petraeum Jackes
- Tetrastigma petrophilum Lauterb.
- Tetrastigma pilosum C.L.Li
- Tetrastigma planicaule (Hook.f.) Gagnep.
- Tetrastigma poilanei Gagnep.
- Tetrastigma pseudocruciatum C.L.Li
- Tetrastigma pubiflorum (Miq.) Suess.
- Tetrastigma pubinerve Merr. & Chun
- Tetrastigma pullei Lauterb.
- Tetrastigma pycnanthum (Collett & Hemsl.) P.Singh & B.V.Shetty
- Tetrastigma pyriforme Gagnep.
- Tetrastigma quadrangulum Gagnep. & Craib
- Tetrastigma quadridens Planch.
- Tetrastigma rafflesiae (Miq.) Planch.
- Tetrastigma ramentaceum Planch.
- Tetrastigma retinervium Planch.
- Tetrastigma robinsonii Merr.
- Tetrastigma robustum Planch.
- Tetrastigma rumicispermum (M.A.Lawson) Planch.
- Tetrastigma rupestre Planch.
- Tetrastigma scariosum (Blume) Planch.
- Tetrastigma schlechteri Lauterb.
- Tetrastigma schraderi-montis Lauterb.
- Tetrastigma scortechinii (King) Gagnep.
- Tetrastigma sepulchrei Merr.
- Tetrastigma serrulatum (Roxb.) Planch.
- Tetrastigma sessilifolium Lauterb.
- Tetrastigma siamense Gagnep. & Craib
- Tetrastigma sichouense C.L.Li
- Tetrastigma silvestrei Elmer ex J.Wen & Boggan
- Tetrastigma simplicifolia (Merr.) J.Wen & Boggan
- Tetrastigma steenisii Latiff
- Tetrastigma subglobosum Latiff & Fatiha
- Tetrastigma subsuberosum Planch.
- Tetrastigma subtetragonum C.L.Li
- Tetrastigma sulcatum (M.A.Lawson) Gamble
- Tetrastigma taeniatum C.L.Li
- Tetrastigma tamilnadense N.Balach. & K.Ravik.
- Tetrastigma tavoyanum Gagnep.
- Tetrastigma tetragynum (Miq.) Planch.
- Tetrastigma thomsonianum Planch.
- Tetrastigma thorsborneorum Jackes
- Tetrastigma tonkinense Gagnep.
- Tetrastigma touranense Gagnep.
- Tetrastigma triphyllum (Gagnep.) W.T.Wang
- Tetrastigma tsaianum C.Y.Wu
- Tetrastigma venulosum C.Y.Wu
- Tetrastigma vitiense (A.Gray) A.C.Sm.
- Tetrastigma voinierianum (Sallier) Pierre ex Gagnep.
- Tetrastigma warburgii Lauterb.
- Tetrastigma xishuangbannaense C.L.Li
- Tetrastigma xizangense C.L.Li
- Tetrastigma yiwuense C.L.Li
- Tetrastigma yunnanense Gagnep.

=== Other species ===
Tetrastigma caobangense was newly described in October 2026. As of November 2026, it had not yet been included in POWO's database.
