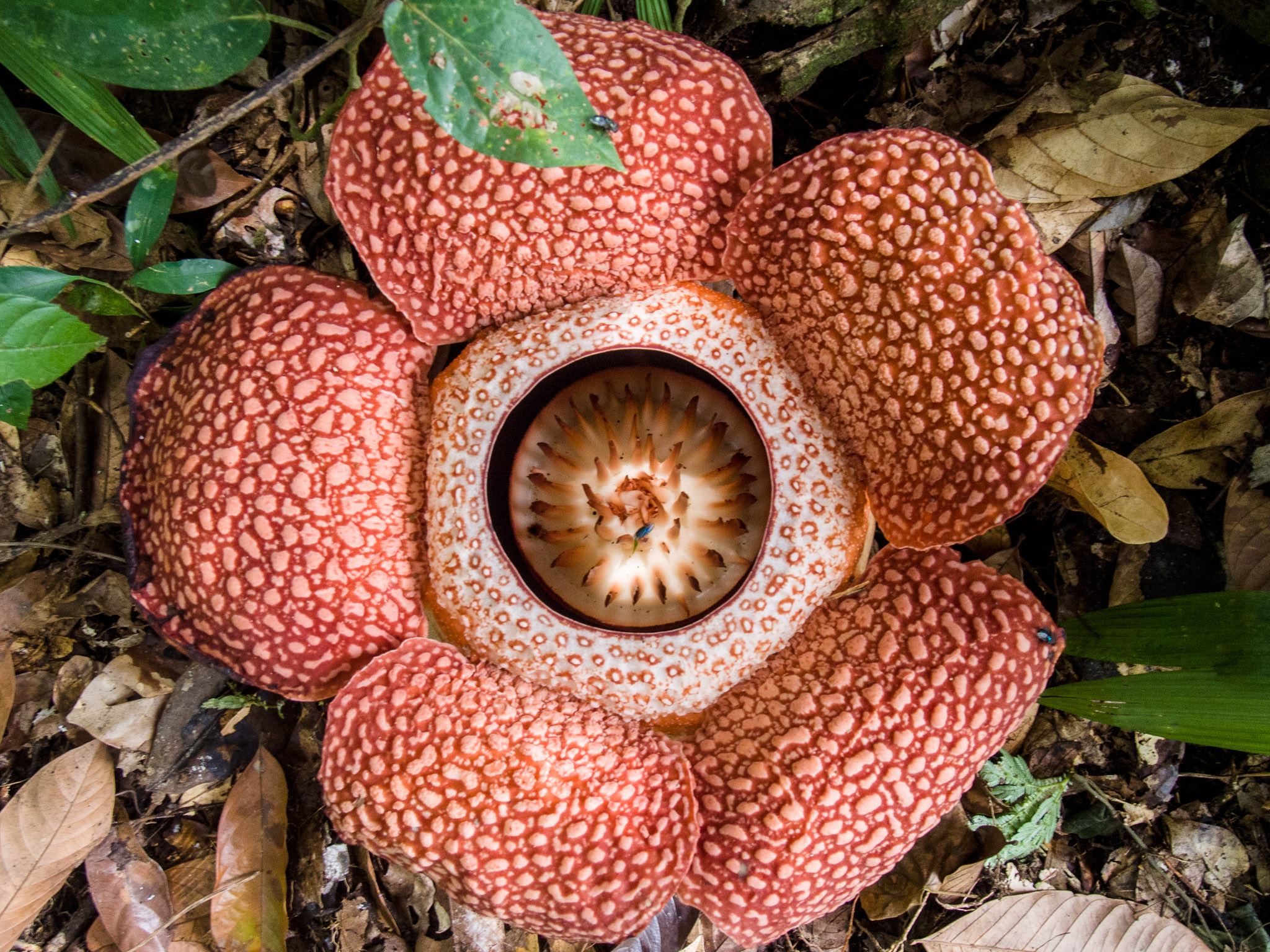
- Rafflesia keithii flower

Scientific classification
- Kingdom: Plantae
- Clade: Embryophytes
- Clade: Tracheophytes
- Clade: Angiosperms
- Clade: Eudicots
- Clade: Rosids
- Order: Malpighiales
- Family: Rafflesiaceae; Dumort.

Genera
- Rafflesia R.Br. ex Gray; Rhizanthes Dumort. Sapria Griff.

= Rafflesiaceae =

Family of flowering plants

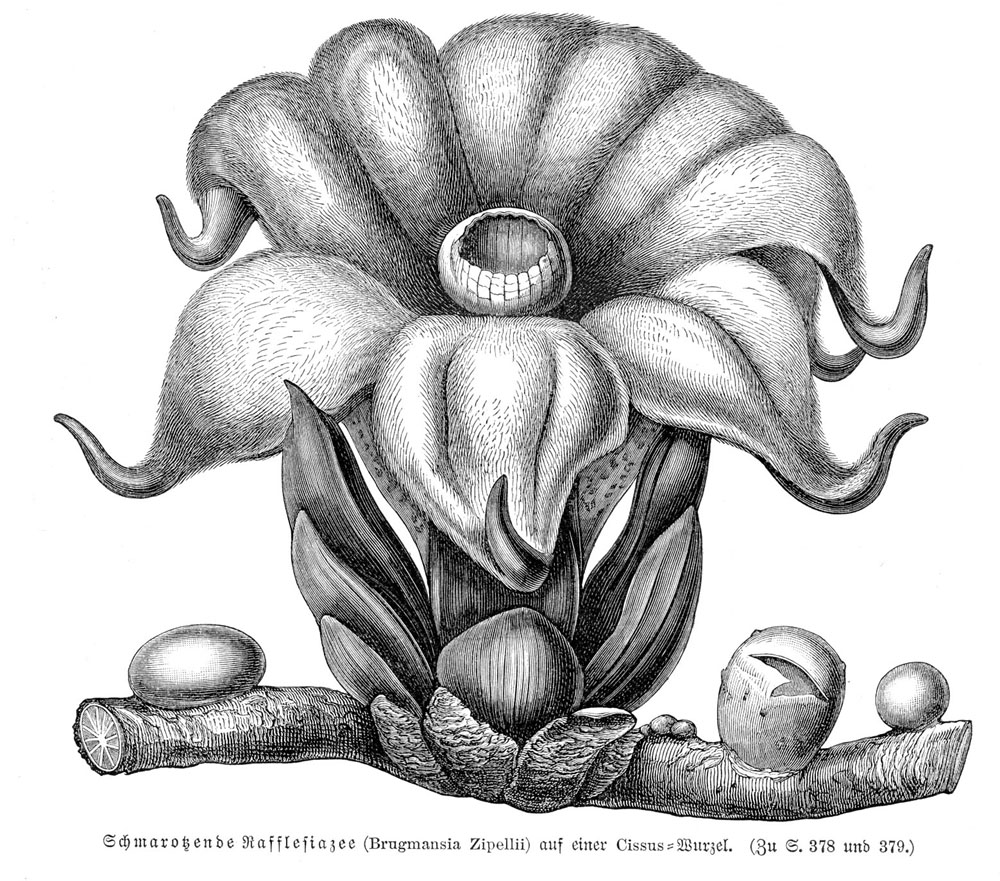
Illustration of Rhizanthes (then known as Brugmansia), a Rafflesiaceae species from Der Bau und die Eigenschaften der Pflanzen (1913).

The Rafflesiaceae are a family of rare parasitic plants comprising 36 species in 3 genera found in the tropical forests of east and southeast Asia, including Rafflesia arnoldii, which has the largest flowers of all plants. The plants are endoparasites of vines in the genus Tetrastigma (Vitaceae) and lack stems, leaves, roots, and any photosynthetic tissue. They rely entirely on their host plants for both water and nutrients, and only then emerge as flowers from the roots or lower stems of the host plants.

== Description ==
=== Flowers ===
Rafflesiaceae flowers mimic rotting carcasses in scent, color, and texture to attract their pollinators, carrion flies. For this reason, some flowers of the family Rafflesia are nicknamed "corpse flowers". Most members of Rafflesiaceae possess a large, bowl-shaped floral chamber formed by a perianth tube and a diaphragm. This diaphragm is the opening for carrion fly pollinators and is surrounded by attractive sterile organs. Flowers are generally unisexual, and can range from tens of cm to over a meter large.

== Taxonomy ==
Past taxonomic works have varied as to the classification of Rafflesiaceae. Classifying has been somewhat problematic due to their highly reduced vegetative parts, modified reproductive structures, and anomalous molecular evolution (Davis 2008). Rafflesiaceae lacks rbcL and other plastid genes commonly used for phylogenetic inference about green plants. In fact, Molina et al. (2014) found that a species of Rafflesia, Rafflesia lagascae, is the first studied parasitic plant that contains no recognizable remnants of the chloroplast genome.

Most traditional classifications that were based entirely on morphological features considered Rafflesiaceae sensu lato (in the broad sense) to include nine genera, but the heterogeneity among these genera caused early investigators, such as Harms (1935), to recognize four distinct groups that were then classified as tribes (still within Rafflesiaceae). This tribal system was followed by Takhtajan et al. (1985).

But that classification does not reflect evolutionary relations shown by DNA sequence studies. Three genera in tribe Rafflesieae (namely, Rafflesia, Rhizanthes and Sapria) are in the eudicot order Malpighiales, while genus Mitrastemon (tribe Mitrastemoneae) is in order Ericales [Barkman et al., 2004, Nickrent et al., 2004]. Also, tribe Cytineae (Bdallophyton and Cytinus) is in order Malvales, and tribe Apodantheae (Apodanthes, Berlinianche, and Pilostyles) is in order Cucurbitales [Nickrent et al., 2004; Filipowicz and Renner, 2010].

Thus, the group which was considered a single family, Rafflesiaceae, is composed of at least four distantly related clades, which have morphological similarities due to convergent evolution under their common parasitic lifestyle. A goal of taxonomy is to classify together only plants that all share a common ancestor, i.e., are monophyletic. Thus, currently the original Rafflesiaceae sensu lato is split into four families:

- Rafflesiaceae (sensu stricto): Rafflesia, Rhizanthes, Sapria — order Malpighiales
- Mitrastemonaceae: Mitrastemon — order Ericales
- Cytinaceae: Bdallophyton, Cytinus — order Malvales
- Apodanthaceae: Apodanthes, Berlinianche, Pilostyles — order Cucurbitales

These four families can be easily distinguished by floral and inflorescence features:

- Rafflesiaceae: inferior ovary, large flowers occurring singly
- Mitrastemonaceae: superior ovary, flowers occurring singly
- Cytinaceae: inferior ovary, flowers in inflorescences
- Apodanthaceae: inferior ovary, small flowers occurring singly (but arising in clusters from host bark)

=== Phylogenetic analysis ===
Early work on higher-level relationships was able to place Rafflesiaceae (in the strict sense) within the order Malpighiales, but was not able to resolve the closest ancestor within the order. A 2007 phylogenetic analysis found strong support for Rafflesiaceae being derived from within Euphorbiaceae as traditionally circumscribed, which was surprising as members of that family typically have very small flowers. According to this analysis, the rate of flower size evolution was more or less constant throughout the family, except at the origin of Rafflesiaceae – a period of about 46 million years between when the group split from the Euphorbiaceae sensu stricto, and when the existing Rafflesiaceae split from each other – where the flowers rapidly evolved to become much larger before reverting to the slower rate of change.

To maintain monophyletic families, in 2016 the APG IV system separated the family Peraceae from the Euphorbiaceae. A summary cladogram is shown below, with family placements in the APG IV system.

- Euphorbiaceae sensu lato
  - Peraceae (3 genera in the study)
  - - Rafflesiaceae
      - Sapria
      - - Rhizanthes
        - Rafflesia
    - Euphorbiaceae sensu stricto (18 genera in the study)

A more recent study has been provided by Liming Cai et al. (2021)

== Horizontal gene transfer ==
A number of mitochondrial genes in the Rafflesiaceae appear to have come from their hosts (Tetrastigma). Because the hosts are not closely related to the parasites (as shown by molecular phylogeny results for other parts of the genome), this is believed to be the result of horizontal gene transfer. Especially high rates of HGT have been found to take place in Rafflesiaceae mitochondrial genes when compared to nuclear genes and to HGT in autotrophic plants.

== Sources ==
- Barkman, T.J., S.-H. Lim, K. Mat Salleh and J. Nais. 2004. Mitochondrial DNA sequences reveal the photosynthetic relatives of Rafflesia, the world's largest flower. Proceedings of the National Academy of Sciences of USA 101:787–792.
- Charles C. Davis, Maribeth Latvis, Daniel L. Nickrent, Kenneth J. Wurdack, David A. Baum. 2007. Floral gigantism in Rafflesiaceae. Science Express, published online January 11, 2007 (online abstract here).
- Filipowicz, N. and Renner, S.S., 2010. The worldwide holoparasitic Apodanthaceae confidently placed in the Cucurbitales by nuclear and mitochondrial gene trees. BMC Evolutionary Biology, 10: p. 219.
- Meijer, W. 1997. Rafflesiaceae, in Flora Malesiana I, 13: 1–42.
- Jeanmaire Molina; Khaled M Hazzouri; Daniel Nickrent; et al. (23 January 2014). "Possible loss of the chloroplast genome in the parasitic flowering plant Rafflesia lagascae (Rafflesiaceae)". Molecular Biology and Evolution. 31 (4): 793–803. doi:10.1093/MOLBEV/MSU051. ISSN 0737-4038. PMC 3969568. PMID 24458431. Wikidata Q34399816.
- Nickrent, D.L., A. Blarer, Y.-L. Qiu, R. Vidal-Russell and F.E. Anderson. 2004. Phylogenetic inference in Rafflesiales: the influence of rate heterogeneity and horizontal gene transfer. BMC Evolutionary Biology 4:40 (HTML abstract PDF fulltext).
