= Prunus cornuta =

Scientific classification
- Kingdom: Plantae
- Clade: Tracheophytes
- Clade: Angiosperms
- Clade: Eudicots
- Clade: Rosids
- Order: Rosales
- Family: Rosaceae
- Genus: Prunus
- Subgenus: Prunus subg. Padus
- Species: P. cornuta

Binomial name
- Prunus cornuta (Wall. ex Royle) Steud.

Synonyms
- Cerasus cornuta Wall. ex Royle; Padus cornuta (Wall. ex Royle) Carr.; Prunus glauciphylla S.C. Ghora & G. Panigrahi; Prunus pachyclada Zabel; Prunus racemosa Lam.; Prunus wattii S.C. Ghora & G. Panigrahi

Species of tree

Prunus cornuta, the Himalayan bird cherry, is a species of bird cherry native to the foothills of the Himalayas, including China and the countries of the Indian subcontinent. A medium-sized tree, it can reach 18 m. It is used for a rootstock for sweet cherries in India. Its specific epithet references the "horned" deformation of the fruit seen when a tree is afflicted with the fungal disease pocket plum gall, ascribed to the species Taphrina padi.
