= Govan (disambiguation) =

Govan is a district in Glasgow, Scotland.

Govan may also refer to:

== Places ==
- Govan, Saskatchewan, Canada
- Govan, South Carolina, USA
- Govan, Washington, USA
- Govans, Baltimore, Maryland, USA

== Given name ==
- St Govan (died 586), Irish monk in Pembrokeshire, Wales
- Govan Hinds, contestant in Big Brother in the UK
- Govan Mbeki (1910–2001), South African politician, father of Thabo Mbeki

== Surname ==
- Alex Govan (born 1929), Scottish footballer
- Andrew R. Govan (1794–1841), U.S. Representative from South Carolina
- Daniel Govan (1829–1911), American Confederate general
- George Govan (1787–1865), Scottish physician and botanist
- Gerald Govan (born 1942), American basketball player
- Guthrie Govan (born 1971), English guitarist
- James Govan (1949–2014), American R&B soul singer
- James Govan (cricketer) (born 1966), Scottish cricketer
- Jock Govan (1923–1999), Scottish footballer
- John George Govan (1861–1927), Scottish businessman and evangelist, father of Sheena
- Michael Govan (born 1963), director of the Los Angeles County Museum of Art
- Sheena Govan (1912–1967), spiritual teacher, daughter of John George Govan
- Tommy Govan, Scottish football full back during the 1950s and 1960s
- William Govan (1623–1661), Scottish officer who fought for the Covenanters during the Wars of the Three Kingdoms

== Other ==
- Govan (ward), electoral division of Glasgow City Council
- Govan High School, secondary school in Glasgow, Scotland
- Govan railway station, formerly on the Glasgow and Paisley Joint Railway
- Govan subway station, underground station and bus interchange
- Govan Shipbuilders, British shipbuilding company based on the River Clyde
- Kvaerner Govan, shipyard subsidiary formed from Govan Shipbuilders in 1988

== See also ==
- Glasgow Govan (disambiguation)
- Govana
