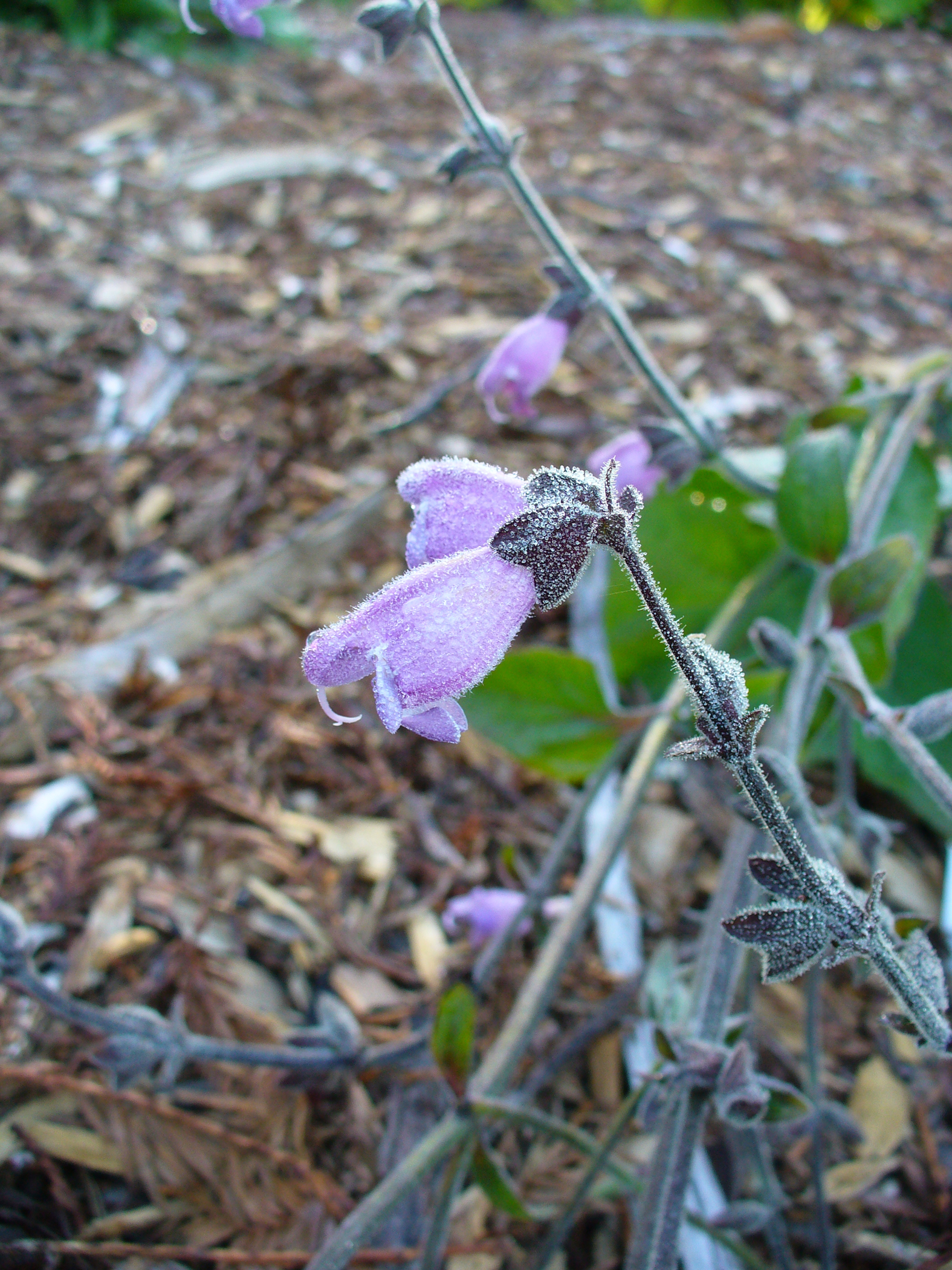

Scientific classification
- Kingdom: Plantae
- Clade: Tracheophytes
- Clade: Angiosperms
- Clade: Eudicots
- Clade: Asterids
- Order: Lamiales
- Family: Lamiaceae
- Genus: Salvia
- Species: S. hians

Binomial name
- Salvia hians Royle ex Benth.

= Salvia hians =

Species of plant

Salvia hians is a mound-forming perennial, native to the Himalayas from Pakistan to Bhutan. It is common in Kashmir, growing at elevations from 2,400 to 4,000 m (7,900 to 13,100 ft) on open slopes and forests. The plant was described in 1830 by John Forbes Royle, a British botanist living in India who studied the medicinal properties of Himalayan plants.

== Description ==
Salvia hians forms a mound reaching 0.6 to 0.9 metres (2 to 3 ft) tall by 0.6 m (2 ft) wide. The leaves are broadly ovate and basally cordate to hastate, with the margins having a mixture of blunt and sharp teeth. The leaves are slightly hairy, and grow up to 25 cm (10 in) long. The flowering stems are held well above the foliage and are much branched, and the flowers are loosely arranged into 4 to 6 flowered whorls. The purple, violet to deep blue, or rarely white corolla is up to 50 mm long and 15 mm wide at the throat, and the tube is somewhat curved. The calyx is 12–15 mm, very sticky and often purple or violet, and broadly obovate to campanulate in shape, those plants common in cultivation have an unusual dark brownish red color. The flower has a gap between the two lips, described by the specific epithet, hians, which means 'gaping', with the lower lip larger than the upper.

== Uses ==
In India, the roots of S. hians are used as a stimulant; in Nepal they are reportedly used as a remedy for dysentery.
