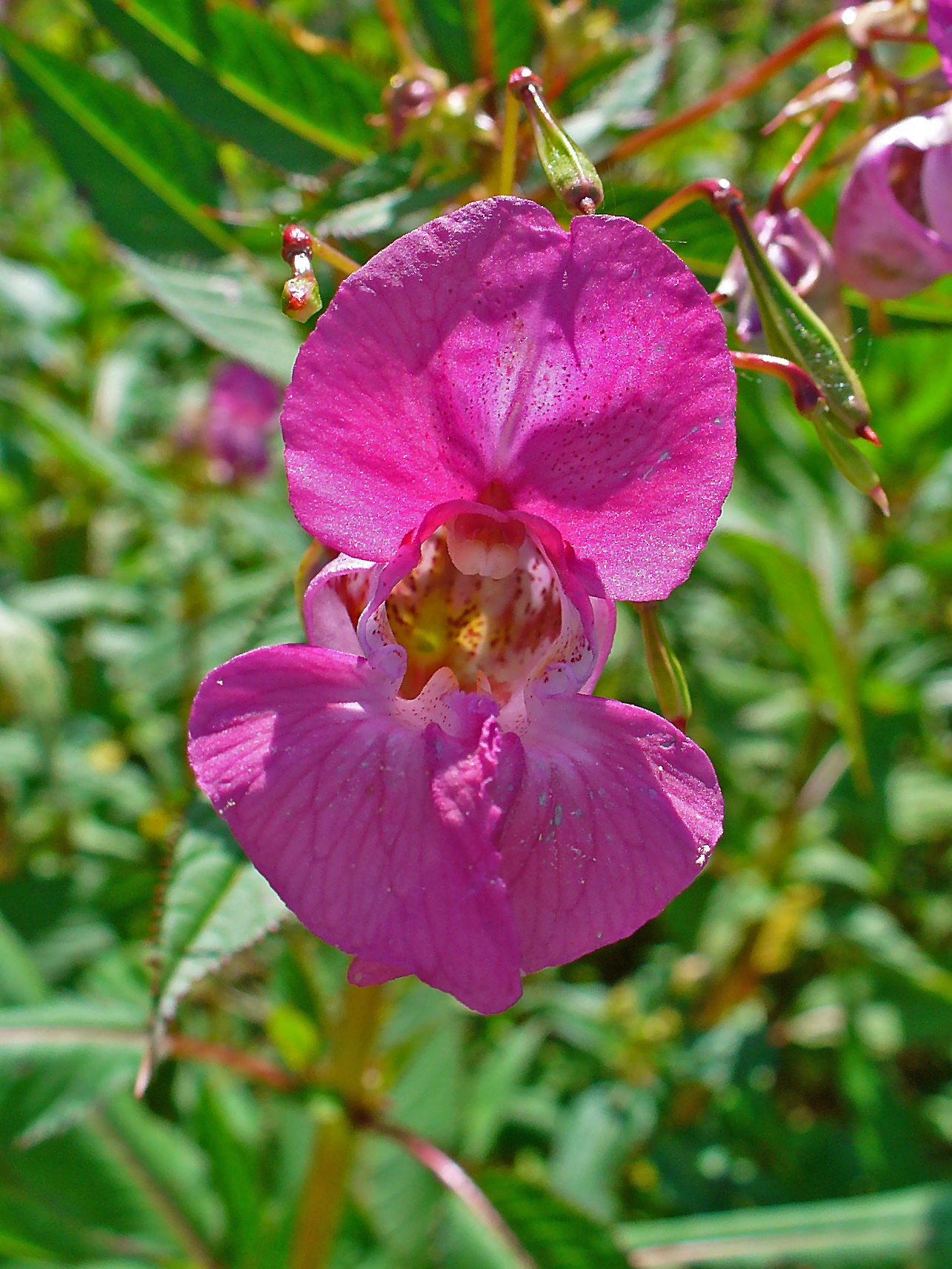

Scientific classification
- Kingdom: Plantae
- Clade: Tracheophytes
- Clade: Angiosperms
- Clade: Eudicots
- Clade: Asterids
- Order: Ericales
- Family: Balsaminaceae
- Genus: Impatiens
- Species: I. glandulifera

Binomial name
- Impatiens glandulifera Royle

Synonyms
- List: Balsamina glandulifera (Royle) Ser.; Balsamina macrochila (Lindl.) Ser.; Balsamina roylei (Walp.) Ser.; Impatiens macrochila Lindl.; Impatiens roylei Walp.

= Impatiens glandulifera =

Species of plant

Impatiens glandulifera, Himalayan balsam and Policeman's Helmet, is a large annual plant native to the Himalayas. Via human introduction it is now present across much of the Northern Hemisphere and is considered an invasive species in many areas. Uprooting or cutting the plants is an effective means of control.

In Europe, Himalayan balsam has been included since 2017 in the list of invasive alien species of Union concern (the Union list). This implies that the species cannot be imported, cultivated, transported, commercialized, planted, or intentionally released into the environment in the whole of the European Union.

== Etymology ==
The common names Himalayan balsam and kiss-me-on-the-mountain refer to the plant's native Himalayan mountains. Ornamental jewelweed refers to its cultivation as an ornamental plant. It is also sometimes known as Policeman's helmet.

The specific epithet glandulifera is a compound word from glándula meaning 'small gland', and ferre meaning 'to bear'.

== Description ==
Scattering its seeds

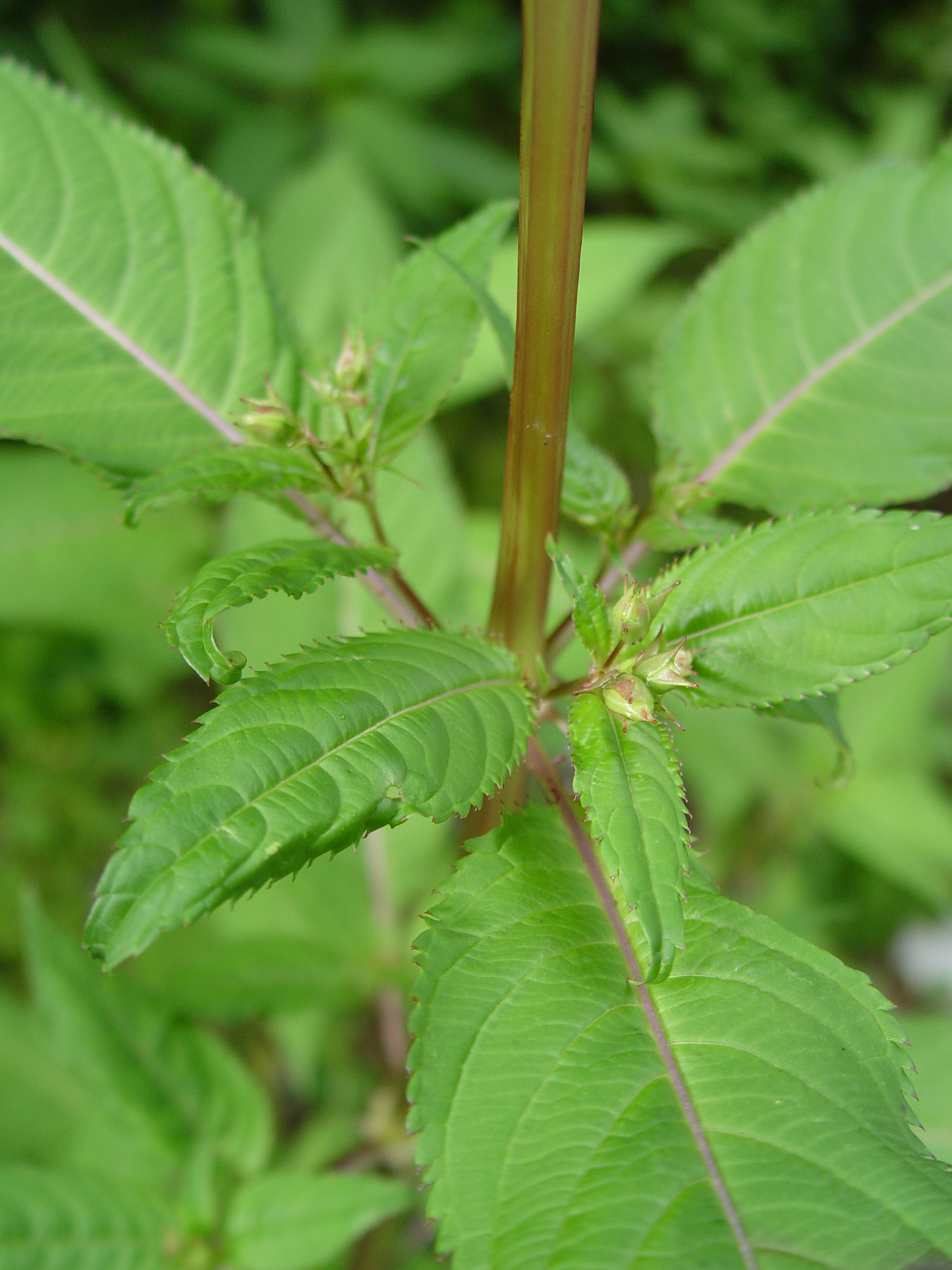

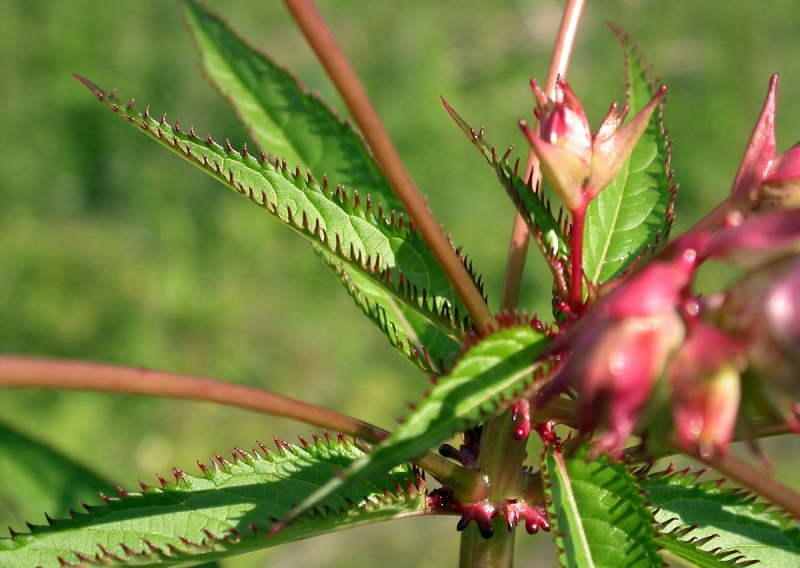
Glands

It typically grows to 1 to 2 m (3.3 to 6.6 ft) high, with a soft green or red-tinged stem, and lanceolate leaves 5 to 23 cm (2.0 to 9.1 in) long. The crushed foliage has a strong musty smell. Below the leaf stems the plant has glands that produce a sticky, sweet-smelling, and edible nectar. The flowers are pink, with a hooded shape, 3 to 4 cm (1 1/4 to 1 1/2 in) tall and 2 cm (3/4 in) broad; the flower shape has been compared to a policeman's helmet.

After flowering between June and October, the plant forms seed pods 2 to 3 cm (3/4 to 1 1/4 in) long and 8 mm broad (1/4 in), which explode when disturbed, scattering the seeds up to 7 metres (23 feet).

The green seed pods, seeds, young leaves and shoots are all edible. The flowers can be turned into a jam or parfait.

The plant was rated in first place for per day nectar production per flower in a UK plants survey conducted by the AgriLand project which is supported by the UK Insect Pollinators Initiative. However, when number of flowers per floral unit, flower abundance, and phenology were taken into account, it dropped out of the top ten for most nectar per unit cover per year, as did all plants that placed in the top ten for per-day nectar production per flower, with the exception of common comfrey (Symphytum officinale).

== Distribution and habitat ==
Himalayan balsam is native to the Himalayas, specifically to the areas between Kashmir and Uttarakhand. In its native range it is usually found at altitudes between 2000 and 2500 m above sea level, although it has been reported at up to 4000 m above sea level.

In Europe the plant was first introduced into the United Kingdom by John Forbes Royle, professor of medicine at King's College, London who became Superintendent of the Botanic Gardens, Saharanpur, India. It has now become naturalized and widespread across riverbanks. At present it can be found almost everywhere across the continent.

In North America it has been found in the Canadian provinces of British Columbia, Manitoba, Ontario, Quebec, Nova Scotia, New Brunswick, Prince Edward Island and Newfoundland. In the United States it is found on both the east and west coast, seemingly restricted to northern latitudes.

In New Zealand it is sometimes found growing wild along riverbanks and wetlands.

== Invasive species ==
Himalayan balsam is sometimes cultivated for its flowers. It is now widely established in other parts of the world (such as the British Isles and North America), in some cases becoming a weed. Its aggressive seed dispersal, coupled with high nectar production which attracts pollinators, often allows it to out-compete native plants. Himalayan balsam also promotes river bank erosion due to the plant dying back over winter, leaving the bank unprotected from flooding. Invasive Himalayan balsam can also adversely affect indigenous species by attracting pollinators (e.g. insects) at the expense of indigenous species. It is considered a "prohibited noxious weed" under the Alberta Weed Control Act 2010.

In the UK, the plant was first introduced in 1839, at the same time as giant hogweed and Japanese knotweed. These plants were all promoted at the time as having the virtues of "herculean proportions" and "splendid invasiveness" which meant that ordinary people could buy them for the cost of a packet of seeds to rival the expensive orchids grown in the greenhouses of the rich. Within ten years, however, Himalayan balsam had escaped from the confines of cultivation and begun to spread along the river systems of England.

It has now spread across most of the UK, and some local wildlife trusts organise "balsam bashing" events to help control the plant. However, a study by Hejda and Pyšek (2006) concluded that, in some circumstances, such efforts may cause more harm than good. Destroying riparian stands of Himalayan balsam can open up the habitat for more aggressive invasive plants such as Japanese knotweed and aid in seed dispersal by dropped seeds sticking to shoes. Riparian habitat is suboptimal for I. glandulifera, and spring or autumn flooding destroys seeds and plants. The research suggests that the best way to control the spread of riparian Himalayan balsam is to decrease eutrophication, thereby permitting the better-adapted local vegetation, that gets outgrown by the balsam on watercourses with high nutrient load, to rebound naturally. The researchers caution that their conclusions probably do not hold true for stands of the plant at forest edges and meadow habitats, where manual destruction is still the best approach.

In August 2014, CABI released a rust fungus in Berkshire, Cornwall and Middlesex in the United Kingdom as part of field trials into the biological control of Himalayan balsam.

Some research also suggests that I. glandulifera may exhibit allelopathy, which means that it excretes toxins that negatively affect neighboring plants, thus increasing its competitive advantage.

The Royal Horticultural Society and the Centre for Ecology and Hydrology recommend that pulling and cutting is the main method of non-chemical control, and usually the most appropriate. Natural Resources Wales has used manual methods, such as pulling plants and using strimmers, to largely eradicate Himalayan balsam from reaches of the River Ystwyth.

== Uses ==
Himalayan Balsam is edible, but should be eaten in moderation as it contains oxalates

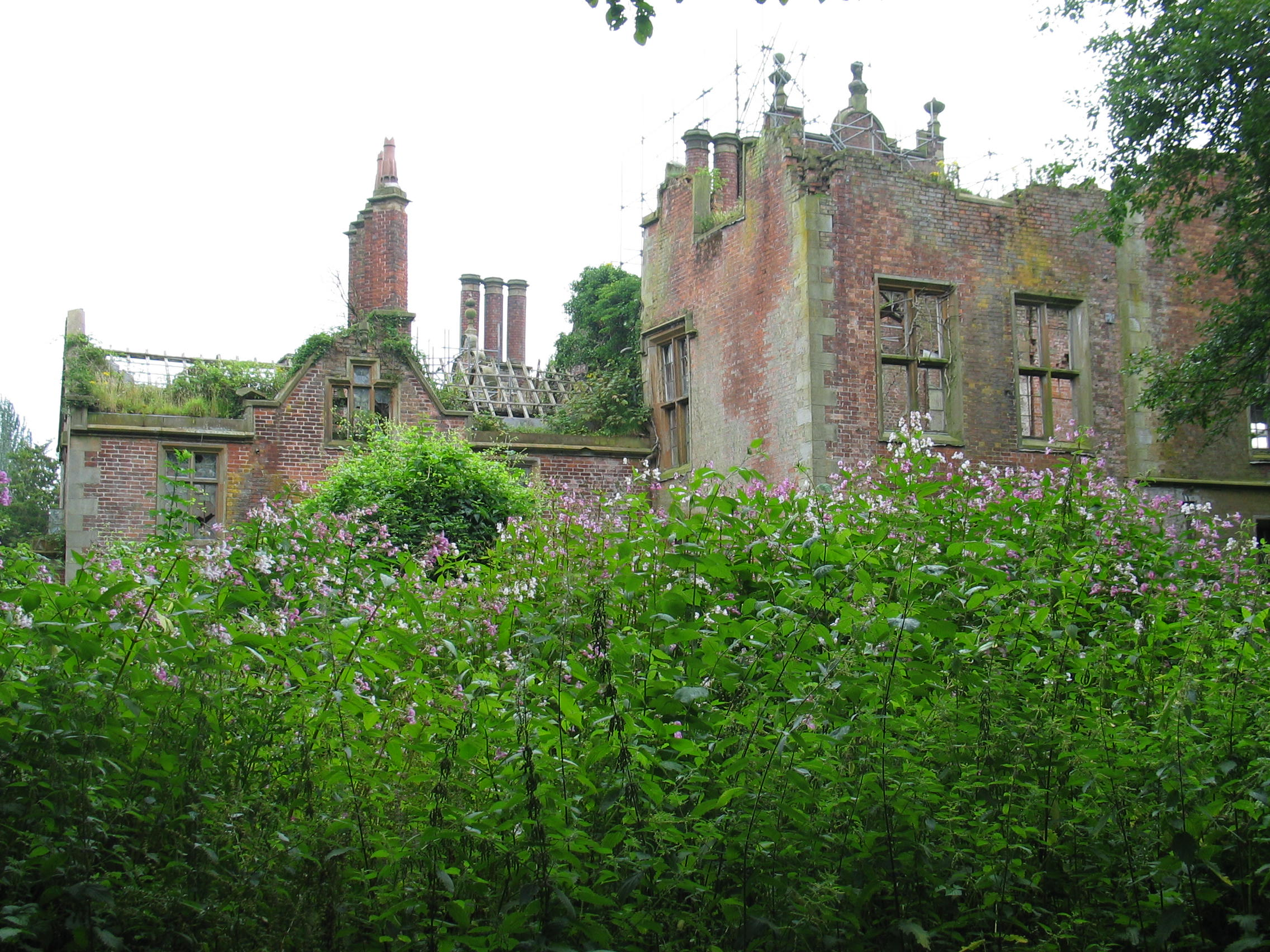
Himalayan balsam, Bank Hall, Bretherton, Lancashire, England

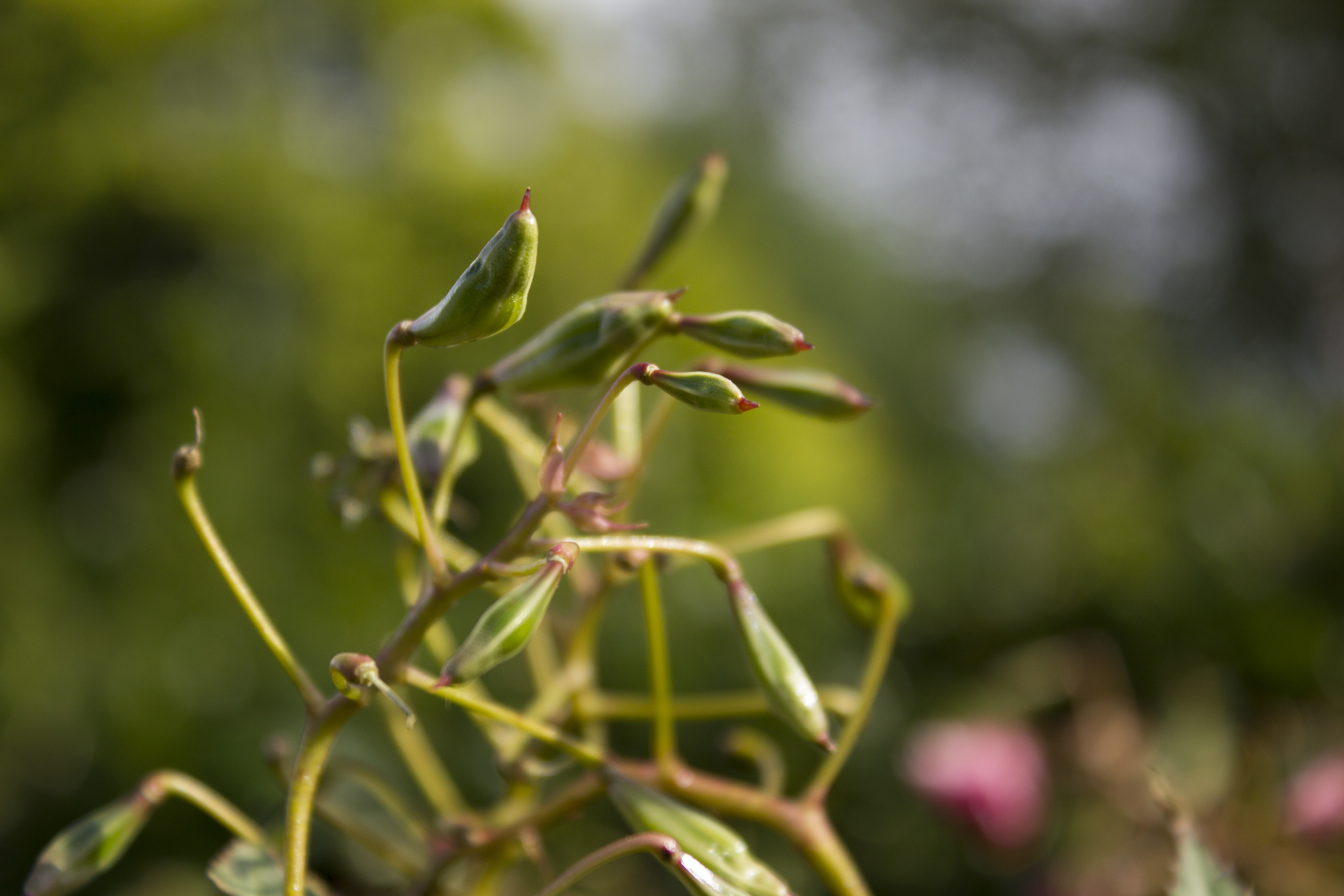
Fruits

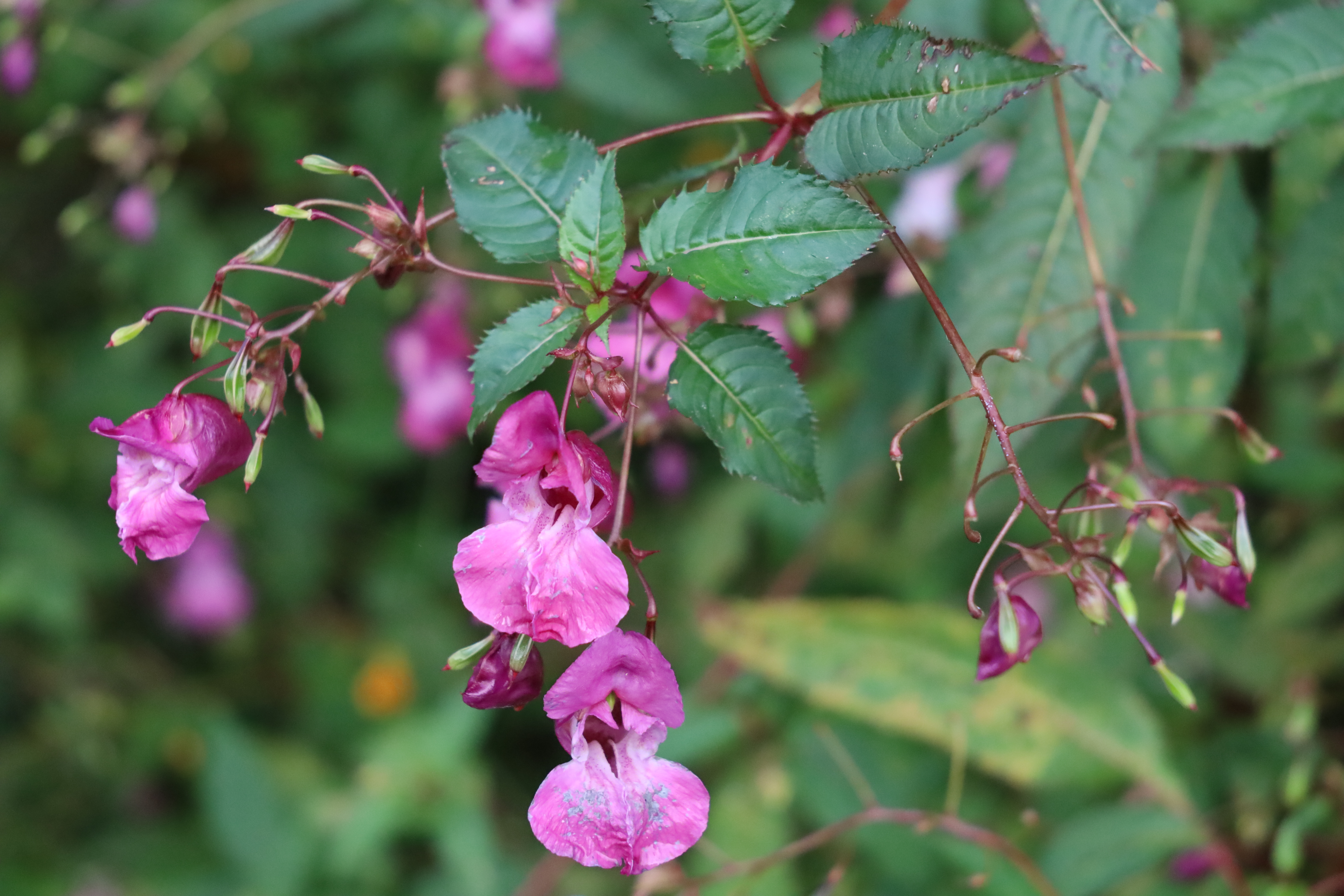
Flowers in Deschambault-Grondines, Quebec, Canada
