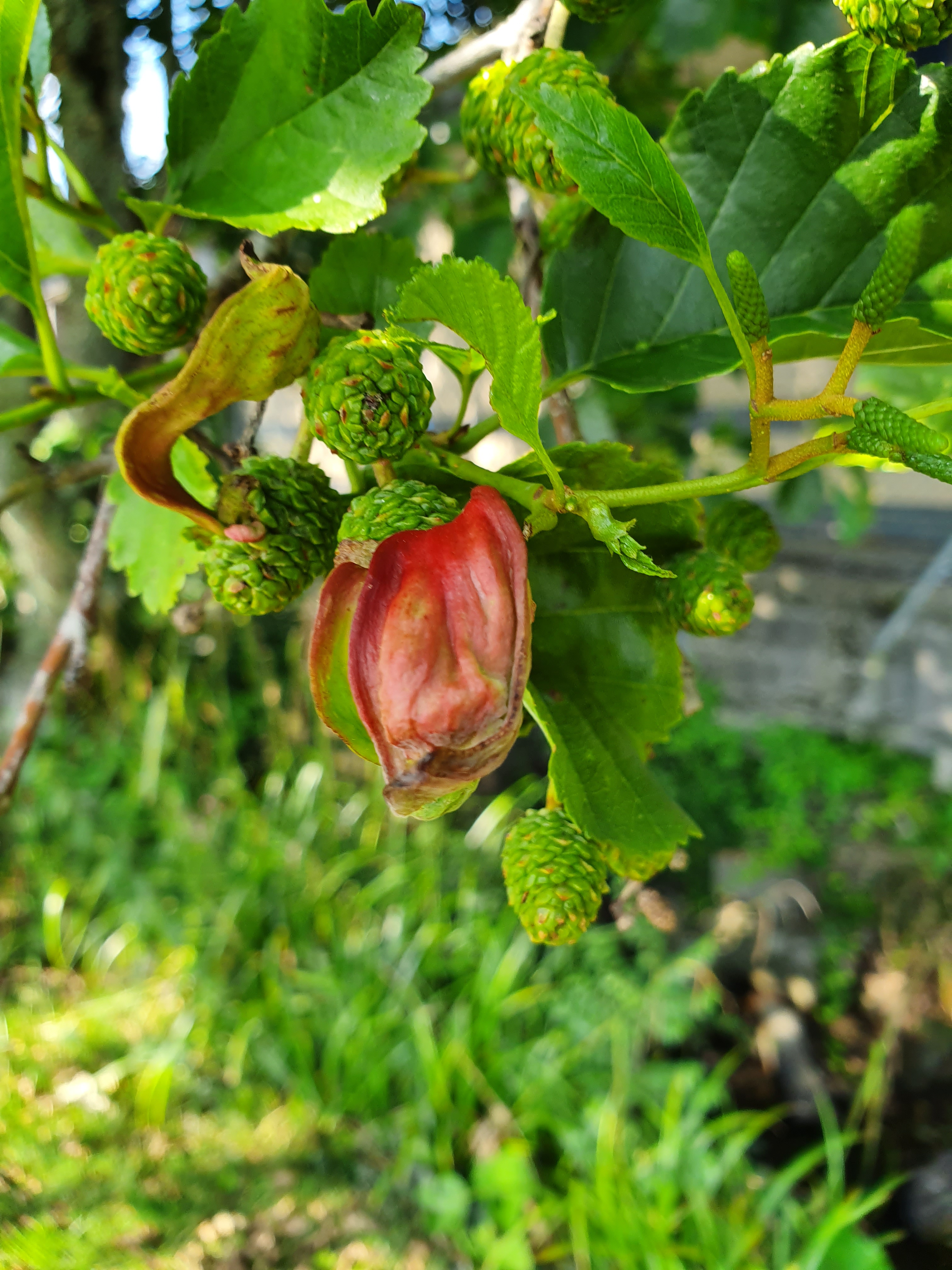

Scientific classification
- Kingdom: Fungi
- Division: Ascomycota
- Class: Taphrinomycetes
- Order: Taphrinales
- Family: Taphrinaceae
- Genus: Taphrina
- Species: T. alni

Binomial name
- Taphrina alni (Berk. & Broome) Gjaerum, 1966

Synonyms
- Taphrina amentorum Exoascus amentorum Exoascus alni-incanae J.G.Kuhn; Ascomyces alni Berk. & Broome; Ascomyces alnitorquus (Tul.) anon. ined. Exoascus alnitorquus (Tul.) Sadeb. 1884; Taphrina alni-incanae (J.G. Kühn) Magnus 1890; Taphrina alnitorqua Tul. 1866

= Taphrina alni =

Alder tongue gall

Species of fungus

Taphrina alni is a fungal plant pathogen that causes alder tongue gall, a chemically induced distortion of female alder catkins (Alnus glutinosa).

Taphrina alni produces a distinctive tongue-like growth which derives mainly from the ovarian tissues of the alder catkin or from the bracteoles. These alder pseudocones may carry several tongue galls, each of which usually appear to come from the same position; those curling down usually come from the bracteoles tissues and those projecting upwards usually come from ovarian tissues.

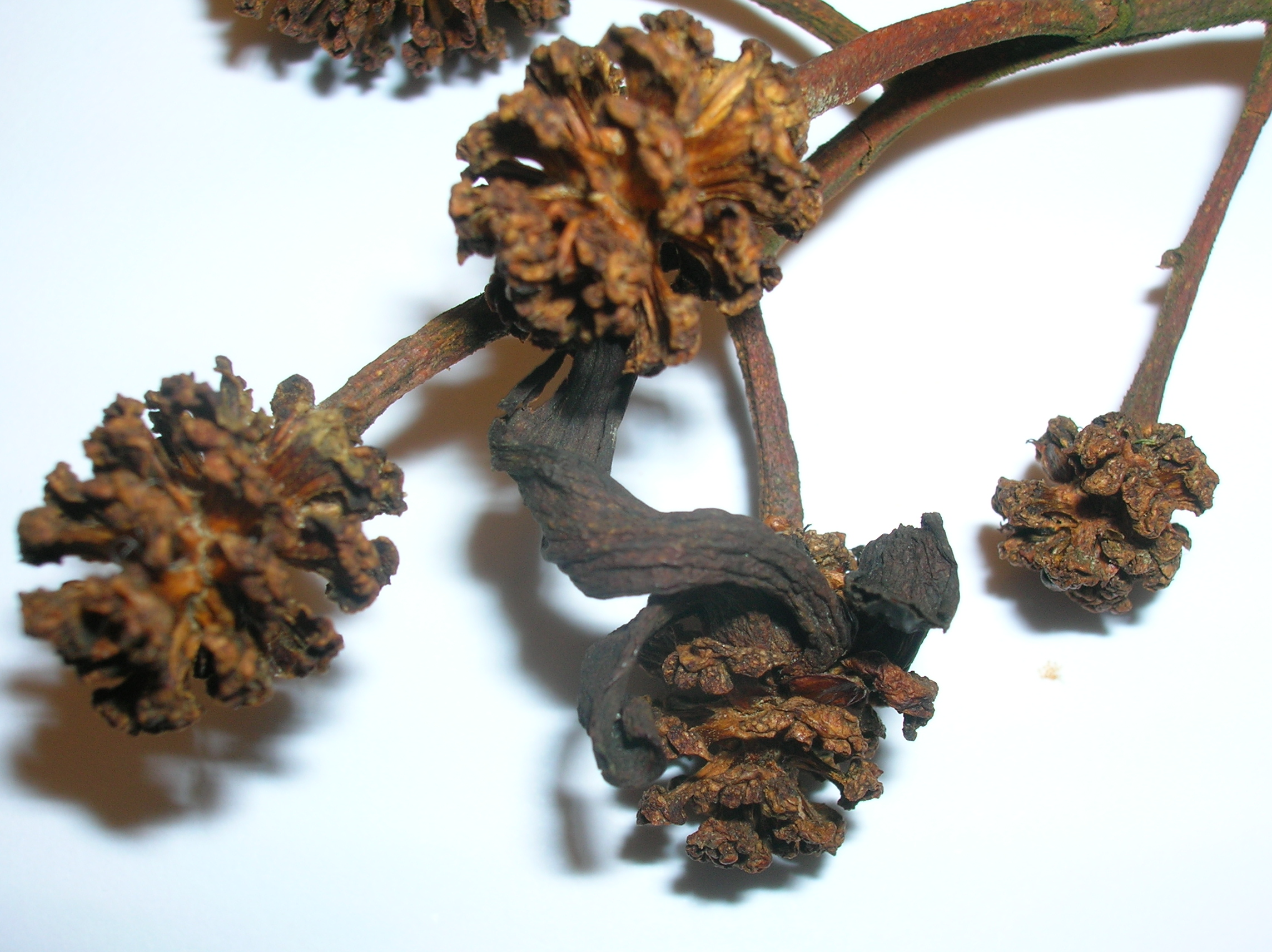
Alder pseudocone and tongue gall in winter.

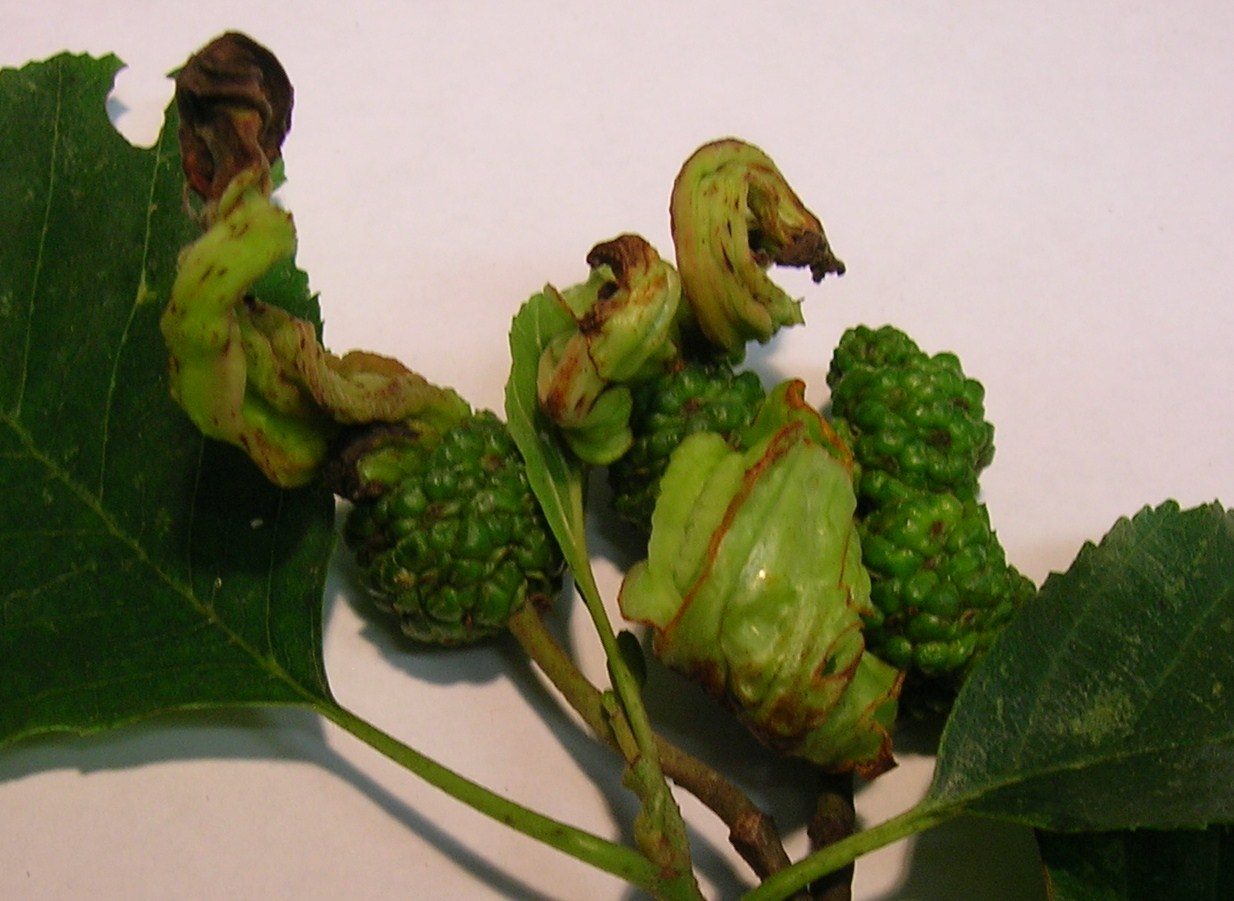
Unusually large languets

== Distribution ==
This gall was rare in the United Kingdom and is absent from many of the published gall keys, although common in Western Europe. It was recorded first in Cornwall in the 1930s, and then in Northumberland, Ayrshire and Skye, mainly since the 1990s. It is becoming quite common throughout the United Kingdom.

== Life cycle ==
The gall develops on the maturing pseudocones and the spores produced are carried by the wind to other trees. At first the gall is pale cream and becomes red or purple later.

== Infestations of alder tongue galls ==
Removing and destroying the galls may help to reduce the infestation. While fairly large, and sometimes present in quite large numbers specimens, they cause no measurable harm.

== Structure and appearance ==
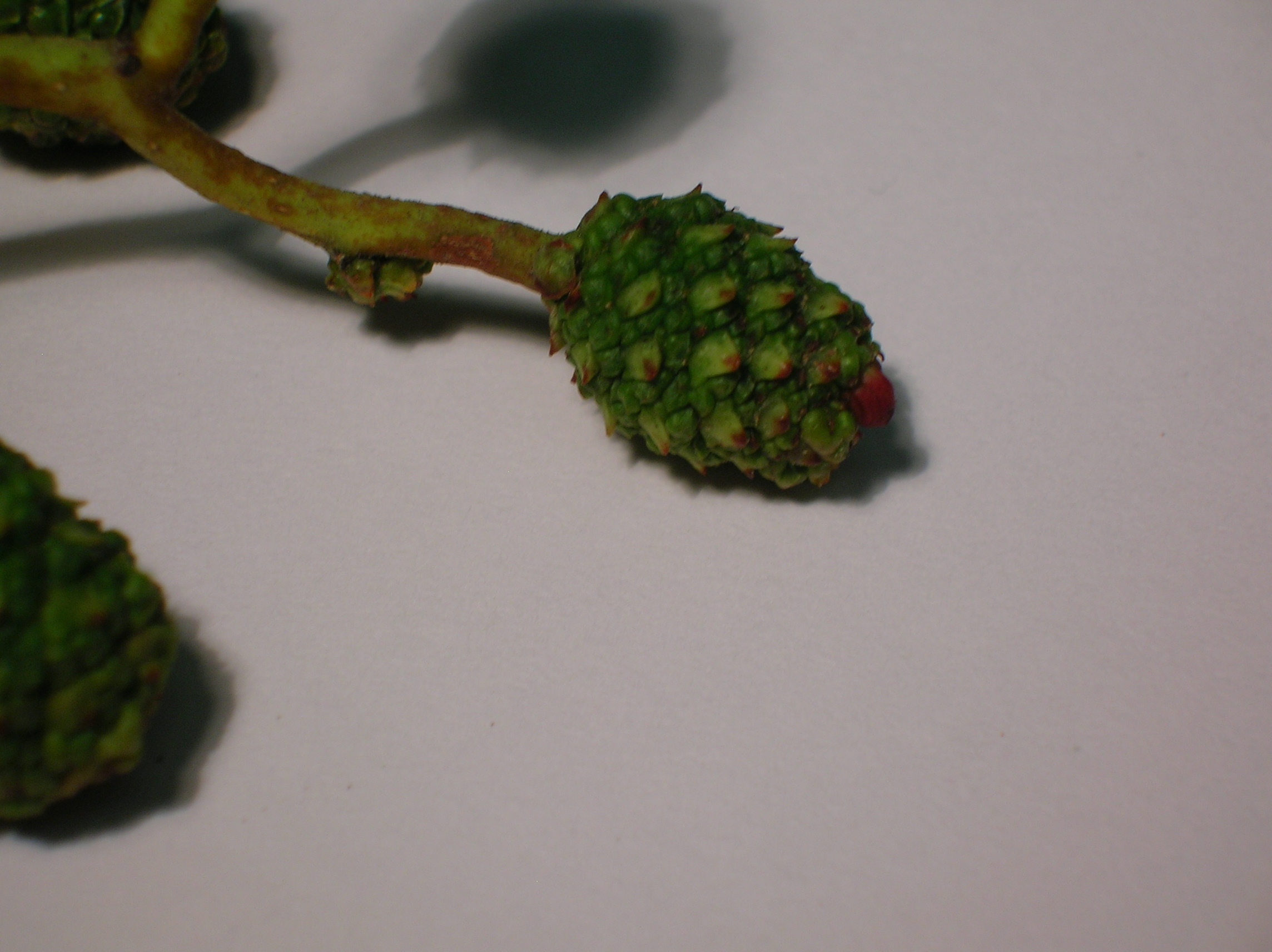
Pseudocone with developing languet

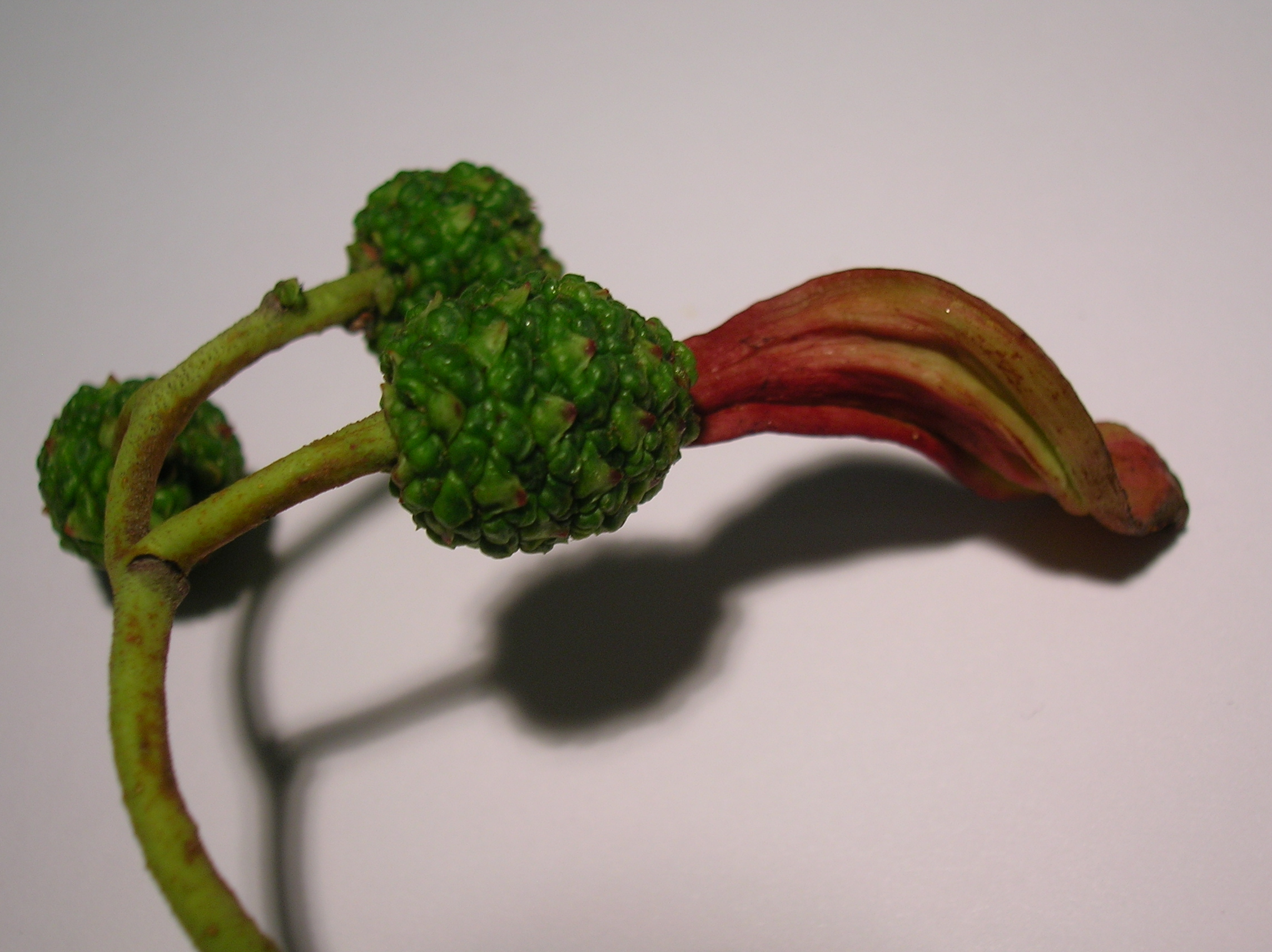
Pseudocone with mature languet

Languets on Alder pseudocones

The gall, known as a 'languet', develops and emerges from between the outer scales like a flat, elongated flag with a hard, smooth and slightly shiny surface lacking any hairs. The outer edges are rounded and the tip is broader than the foot of the 'flag'. Early in the season the flag is fresh and green, but the colours soon start to vary from pale green to yellow, pink, red, purple and orange. Later the galls turn brown or black and remain on the tree for a long time (until the next season). The gall is therefore very persistent and remains attached to the pseudocone throughout its existence, even remaining attached after storms have detached branches and pseudocones.

== See also ==
- Gall
- Oak artichoke gall
- Pineapple gall
- Taphrina padi
- Taphrina pruni
