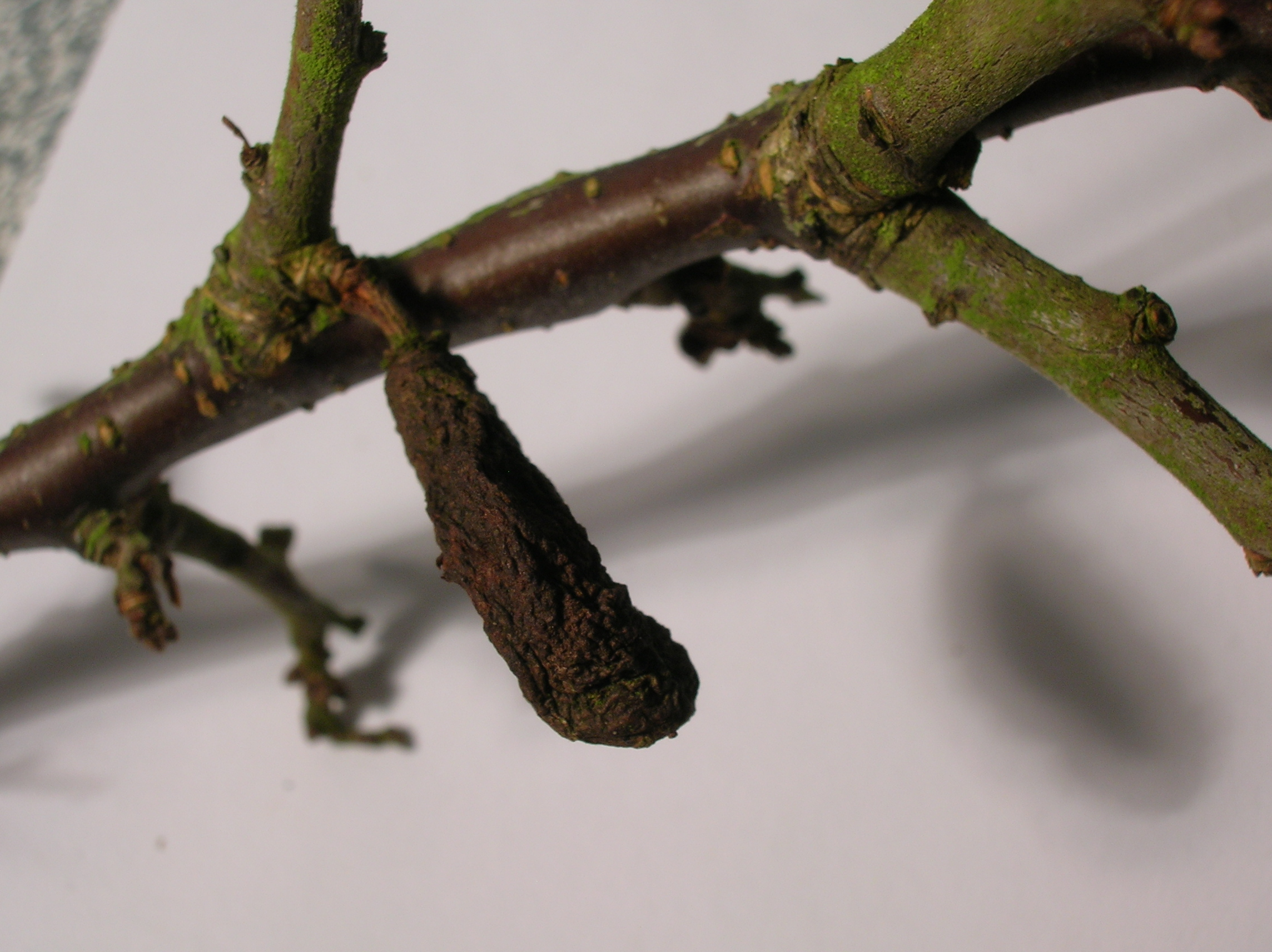

Scientific classification
- Domain: Eukaryota
- Kingdom: Fungi
- Division: Ascomycota
- Class: Taphrinomycetes
- Order: Taphrinales
- Family: Taphrinaceae
- Genus: Taphrina
- Species: T. pruni

Binomial name
- Taphrina pruni Tul. 1866

Synonyms
- Ascomyces pruni (Tul.), W. Phillips, (1887); Exoascus insititiae Sadeb., (1884); Exoascus pruni (Tul.), Fuckel, (1870); Taphrina insititiae (Sadeb.), Johanson

= Taphrina pruni =

Species of fungus

Taphrina pruni is a fungal plant pathogen of blackthorn (Prunus spinosa) that causes the pocket or bladder plum gall, a chemically induced distortion of the fruit (sloes), producing swollen on one side, otherwise deformed and flattened fruit gall without a stone. The twigs on infected plants may also be deformed with small strap-shaped leaves.

== Hosts ==
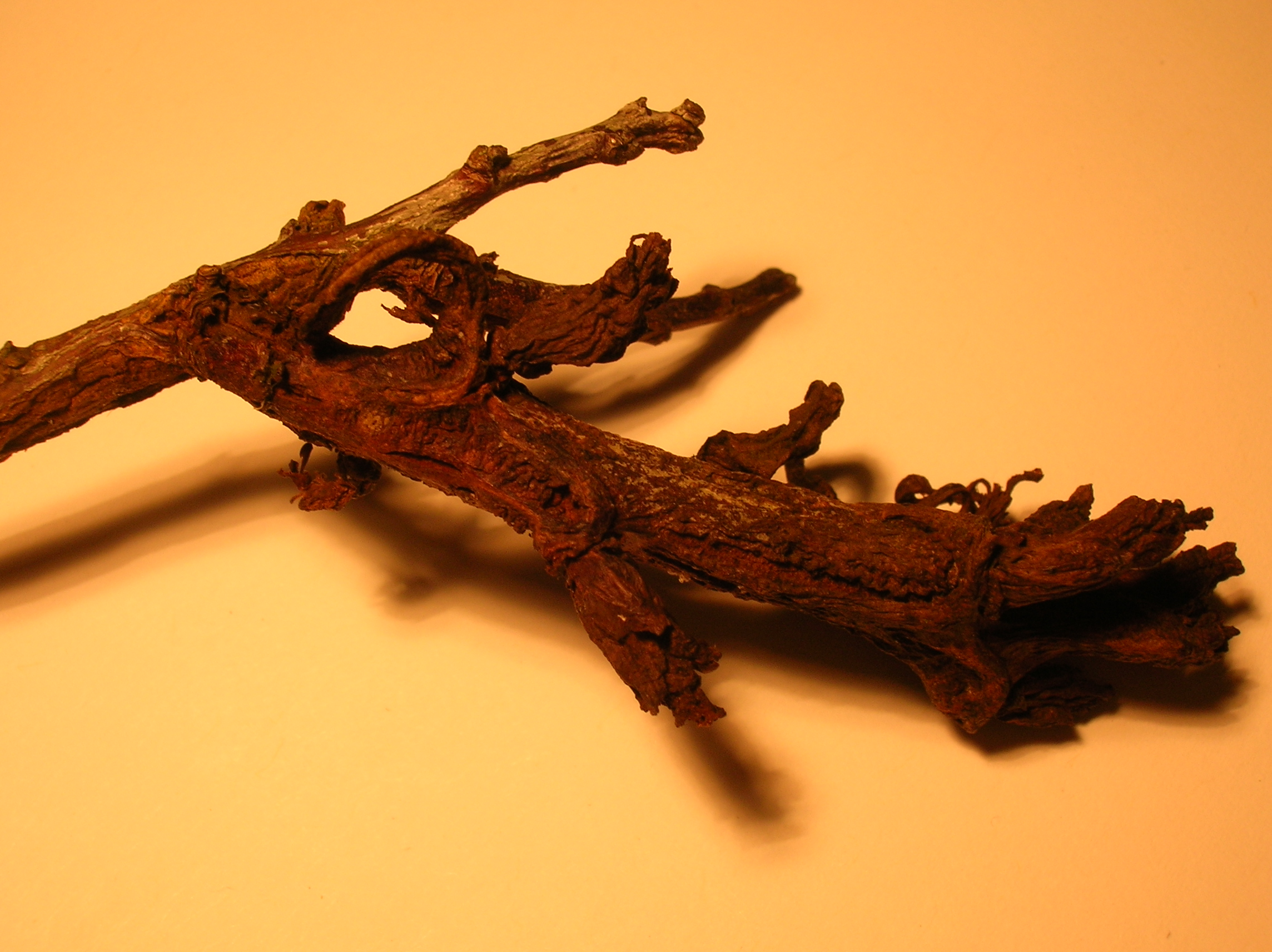
Deformed blackthorn twig.

Taphrina pruni produces a distinctive tongue-like growth, similar to other closely related species such as Taphrina alni on alder (Alnus glutinosa) and Taphrina padi on bird cherry Prunus padus. The growth is the distorted fruit and not a fungus in its entirety.

Taphrina pruni is also found on bird cherry (Prunus padus), almond (Prunus amygdalus), peach and nectarine (Prunus persica). The Mirabelle or Greengage varieties of Prunus domestica may be more resistant.

== Distribution ==
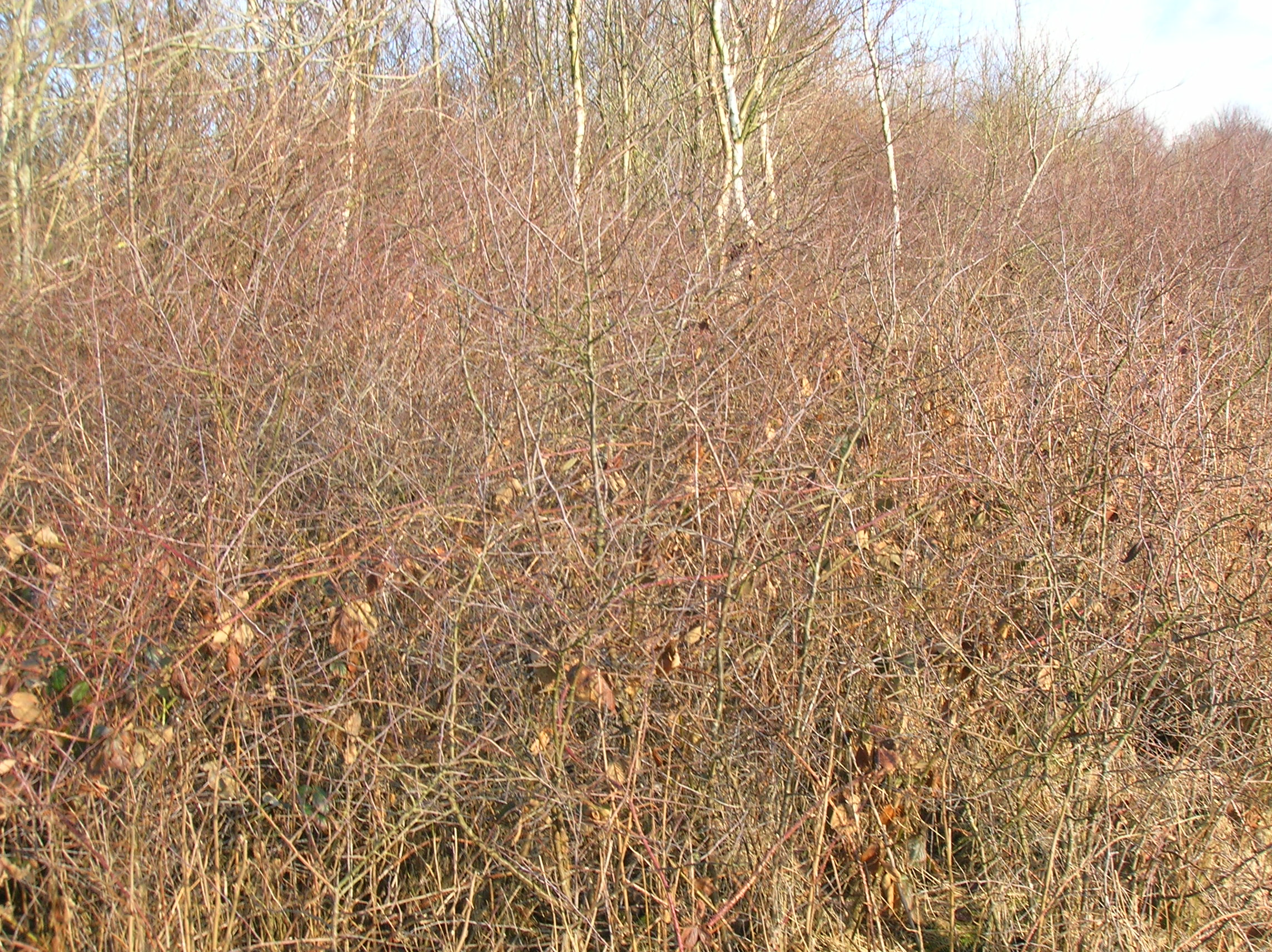
Blackthorn (Prunus spinosa) thicket infected with pocket plum.

The gall is widely distributed, under recorded in the United Kingdom, but found throughout the temperate Northern Hemisphere.

== Structure and appearance ==
=== Fruits ===
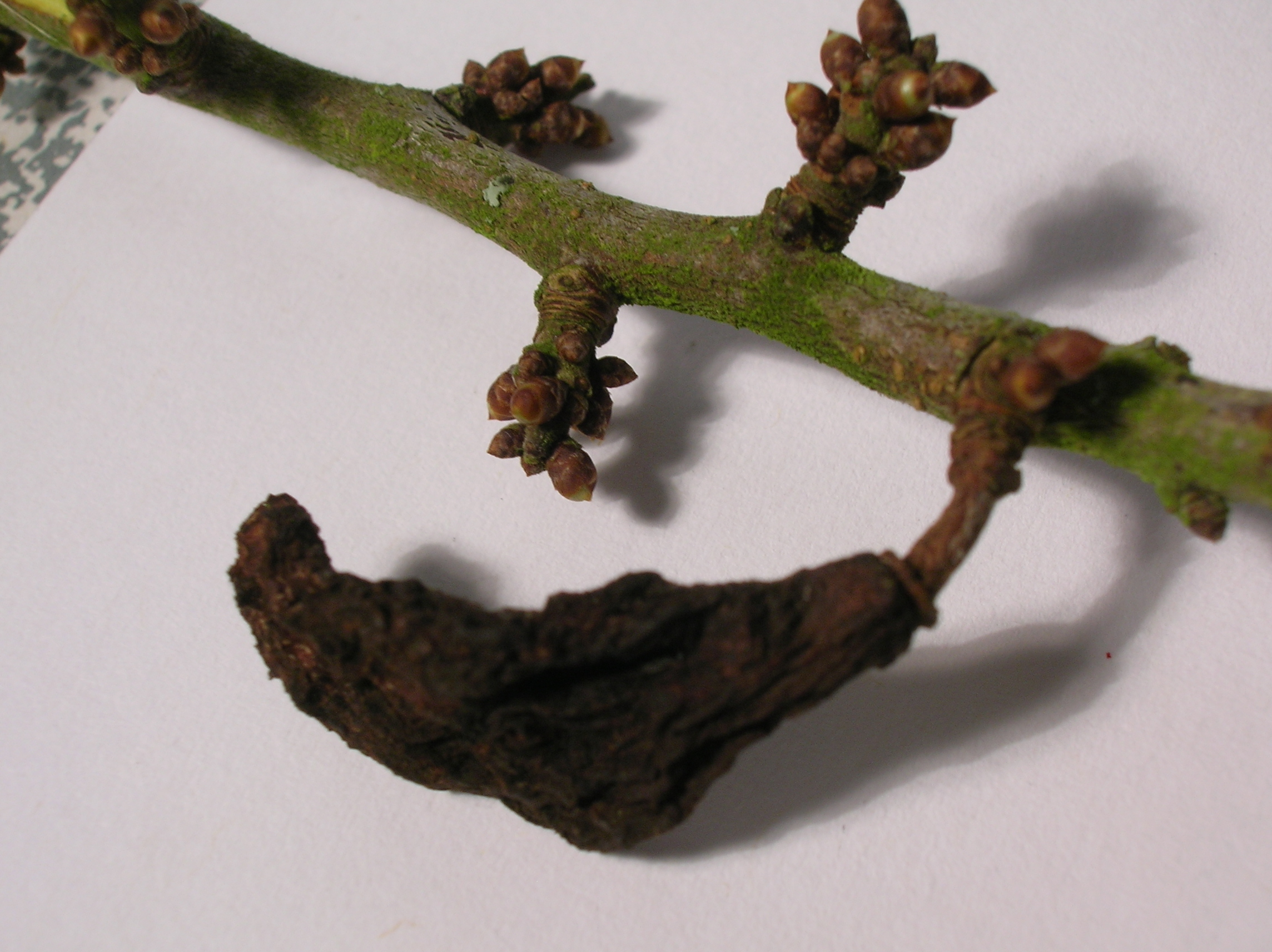
Old gall showing contorted surface on a sloe/blackthorn fruit.

The gall is usually known as 'pocket plum'; however alternatives are 'starved plum', 'bladder bullace', and 'mock plum'. The gall appears on the developing fruit, rendering it inedible and resulting in an elongated, flattened, hollow, stone-less gall ranging in colour from light green through grey to light orange. The surface of the gall becomes corrugate and coated with the fungus, showing as a white bloom of ascospore producing hyphae. The fruits become totally inedible, shrivel, and usually fall.

In Britain the galls form in May and June, reach full size in July and August, and persist to September; some remain on the tree over winter, but most fall to the ground.

=== Stems ===
Stems bearing deformed fruit may also thicken and grow with a deformation. The leaves are smaller and strap-like and shoots may be swollen, pale yellow and tinged with red. The fungus may also cause dense clusters of live and dead twig, called witch's brooms. Some authors suggest these are caused by the very similar Taphrina insititia, others that this is only a form of Taphrina pruni.

== Life cycle ==
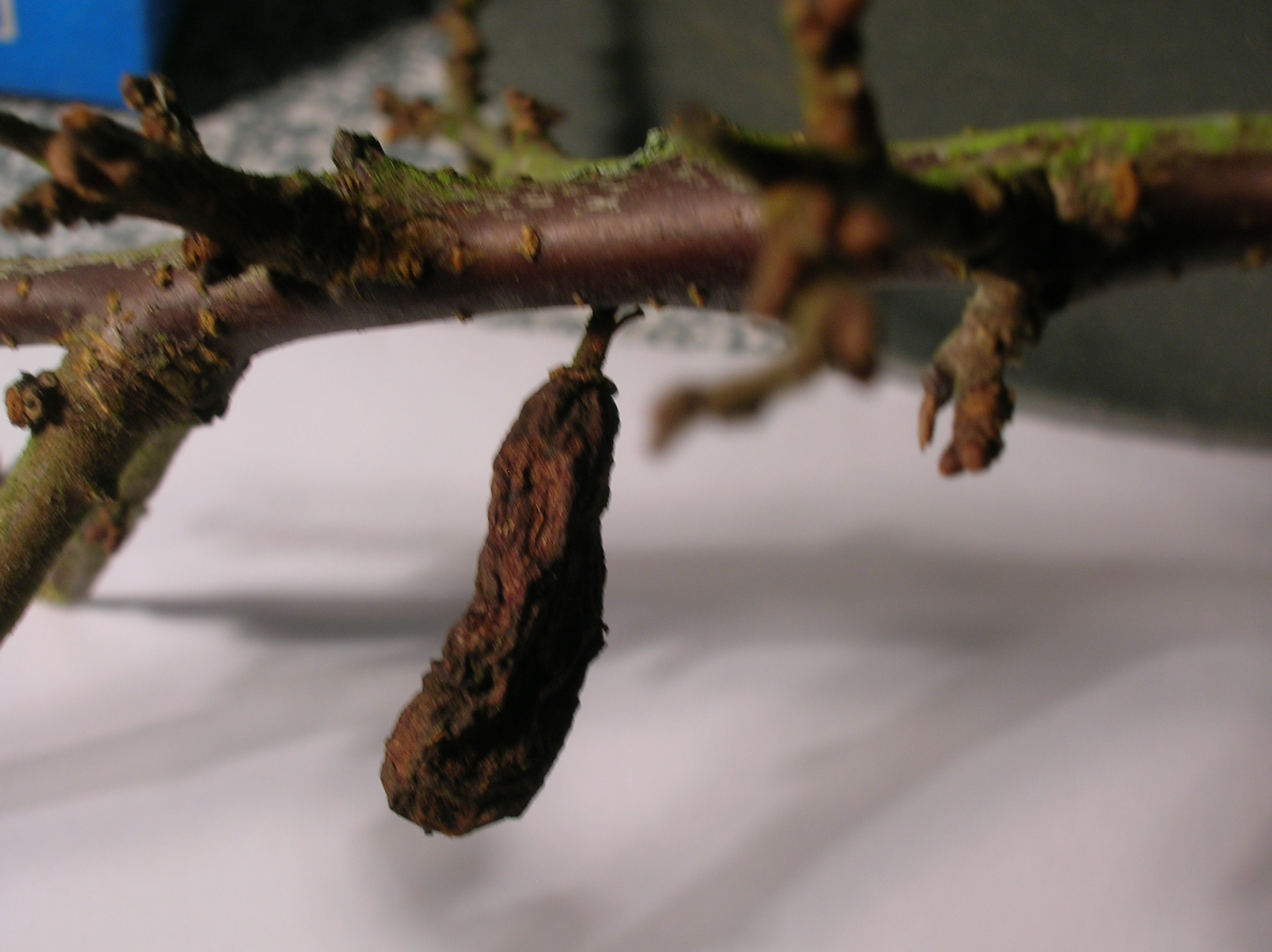
An overwintered specimen.

The airborne spores released from the whitish 'bloom' on the fruit are thought to settle in the host's bark and bud scales, growing at first without causing obvious signs, but in the spring the fungus invades the plant tissues, causing swollen and deformed shoots. The fungus remains in these as a mycelium. The gall inducing fungus then grows into the flowers and the developing fruit. The cycle then repeats itself.

The fungus infects the ovaries causing a pseudo-pollination and an enhanced cell division, resulting in the infested fruit being larger than the healthy one.

== Infestations of galls ==
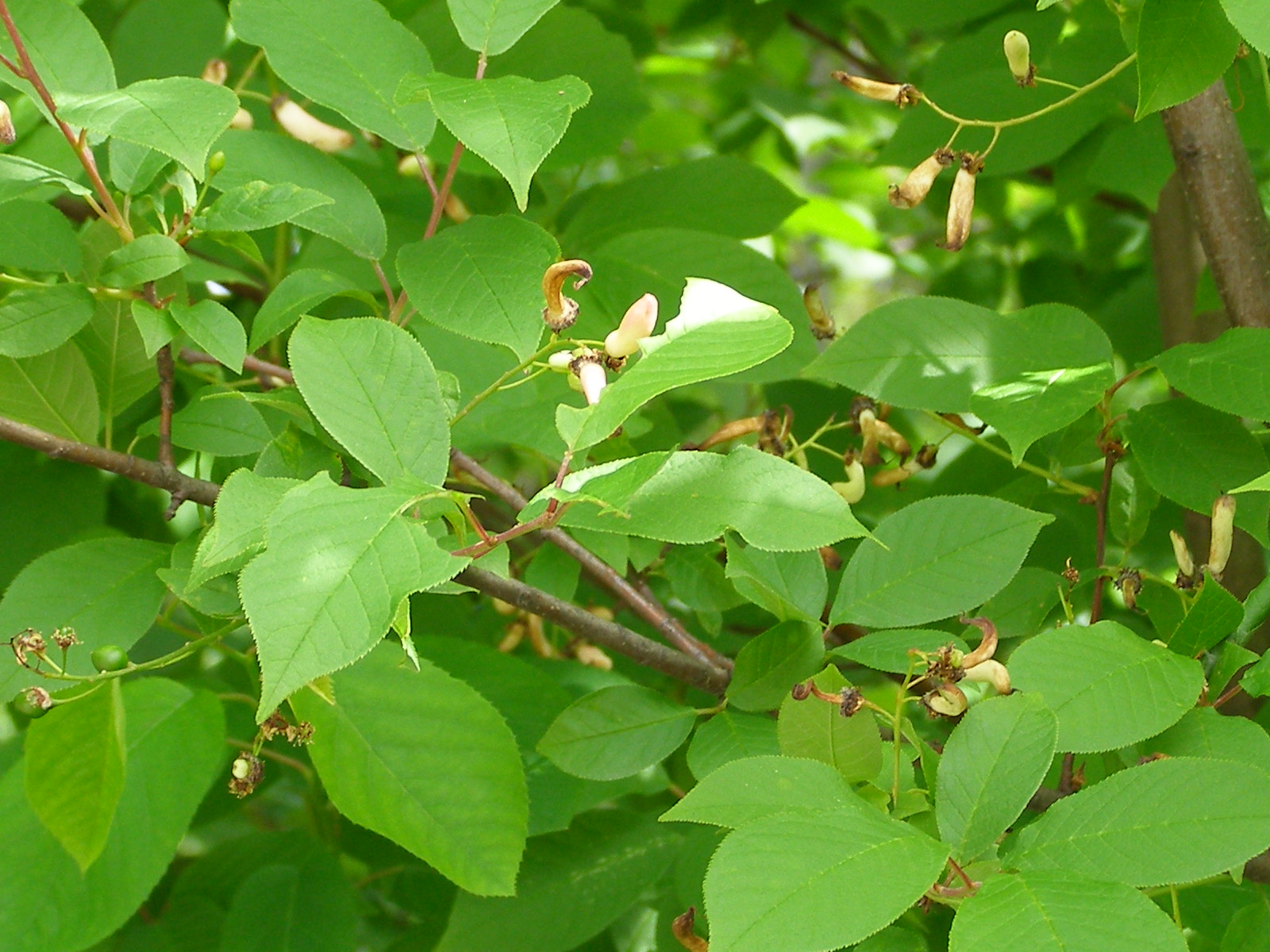
Bird cherry (Prunus padus) with developing pocket plum galls.

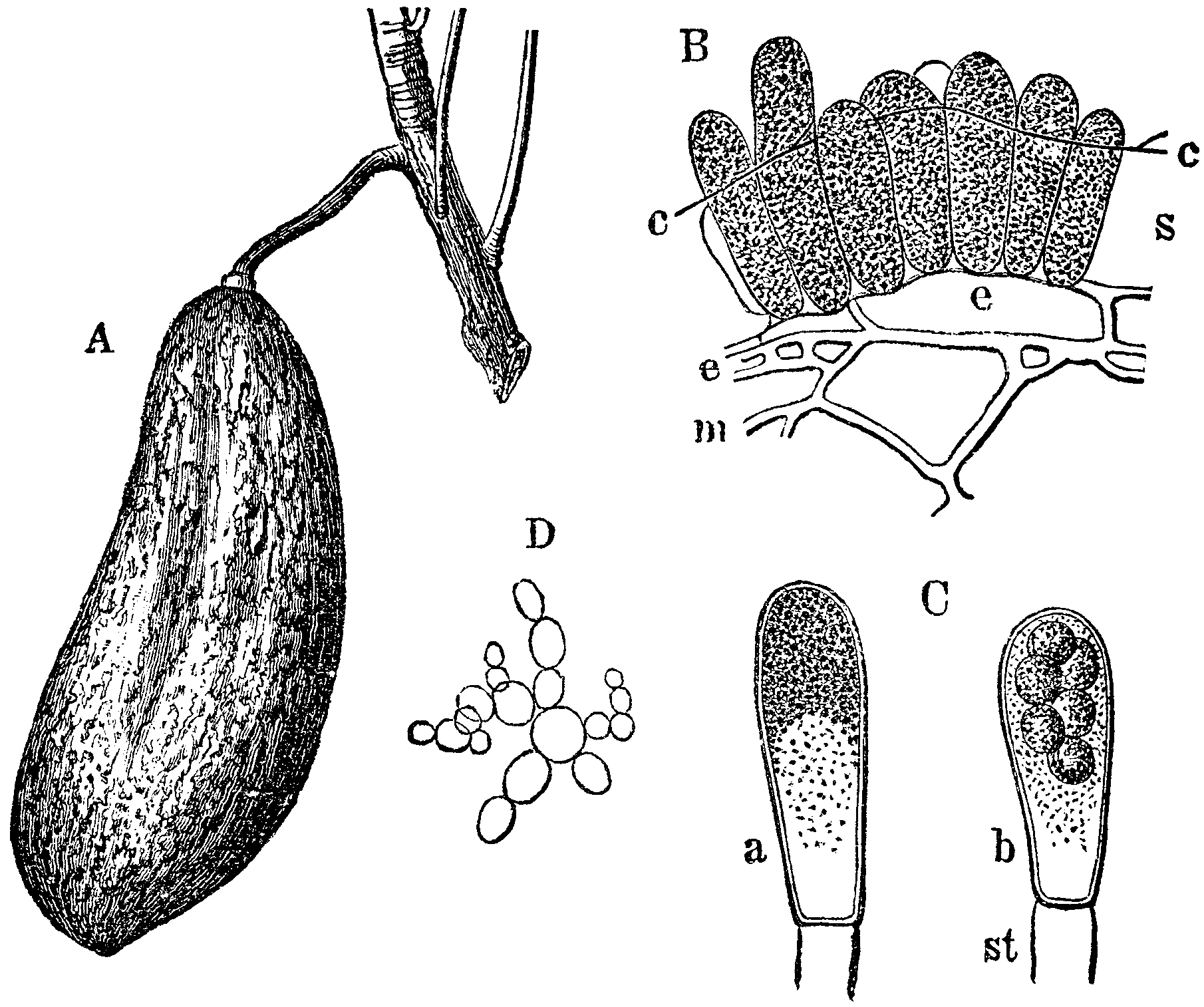
Detail of T. pruni structure.

Cool and wet weather conditions promote the germination of spores; infection is rare in warm dry weather.

Colonisation can become extensive and eradication very difficult. The disease can to some degree be controlled by carefully removing infected branches, witch's brooms and fruit before the infective air borne spores are produced.

Fungicides that contain copper also provide some control.

== Sources ==
- Darlington, Arnold (1975). The Pocket Encyclopaedia of Plant Galls in Colour. Poole : Blandford Press. ISBN 0-7137-0748-8.
- Redfern, Margaret & Shirley, Peter (2002). British Plant Galls. Identification of galls on plants & fungi. AIDGAP. Shrewsbury : Field Studies Council. ISBN 1-85153-214-5.
- Stubbs, F. B. Edit. (1986). Provisional Keys to British Plant Galls. Pub. Brit Plant Gall Soc. ISBN 0-9511582-0-1.
