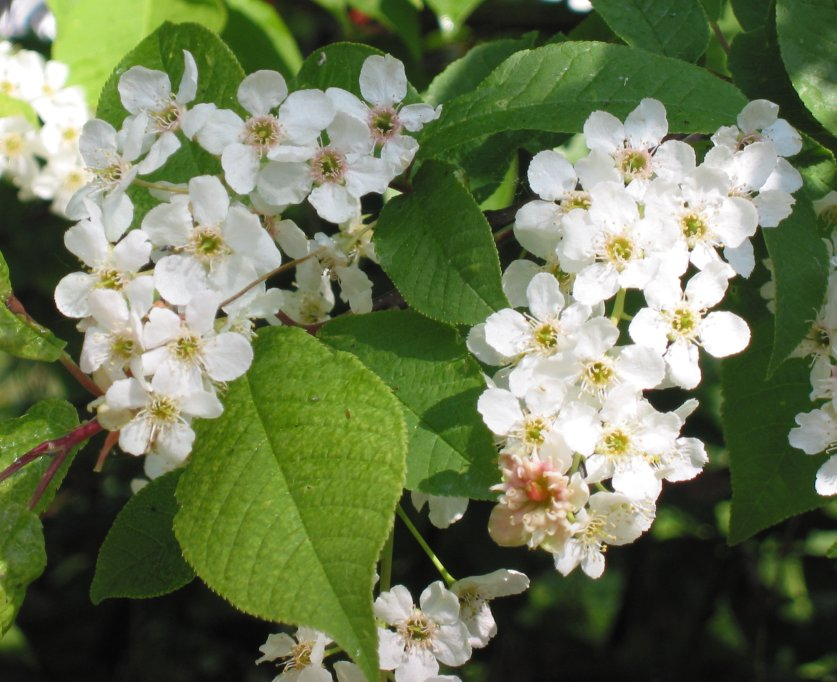
- Bird cherry flowers

Conservation status
- Least Concern (IUCN 3.1)

Scientific classification
- Kingdom: Plantae
- Clade: Tracheophytes
- Clade: Angiosperms
- Clade: Eudicots
- Clade: Rosids
- Order: Rosales
- Family: Rosaceae
- Genus: Prunus
- Subgenus: Prunus subg. Padus
- Species: P. padus

Binomial name
- Prunus padus L.
- Distribution map

Synonyms
- List: Cerasus padus (L.) Delarbre; Cerasus racemosa Gray; Druparia padus (L.) Clairv.; Padus avium Mill.; Padus racemosa C.K.Schneid.; Prunus padus var. genuina Asch & Graebn.; Prunus padus ssp. racemosa Domin; Prunus racemosa Lam.

= Prunus padus =

Species of flowering plant in the rose family

Prunus padus, the bird cherry, is a flowering plant in the rose family, the type species of the subgenus Padus, which have flowers in racemes. It is native to Europe and northern and northeast Asia.

== Distribution ==
Prunus padus is native to temperate Eurasia from the British Isles to Japan. Its distribution includes all Western and Central Europe north of the Pyrenees and the Alps and south of the treeline with small pockets also found in Iberia and Northern Italy and in the Atlas Mountains of North Africa. It also inhabits all of Eastern Europe north of the Balkan Mountains and the Steppe, as well as in the Caucasus. In Asia it is found throughout the forests of Siberia, Mongolia, the Russian Far East, northernmost Korea, Hokkaido, and northeastern China. It is an invasive species in Alaska, prompting efforts at eradication.

== Description ==
It is a deciduous small tree or large shrub up to 16 metres (52 ft), rarely to 20 m tall, with a trunk up to 80 cm diameter. The leaves are alternate, 7–13 cm long and 4–7 cm broad, with finely serrated margins. It flowers in mid to late spring, typically late May in Britain; the flowers are produced on spreading or drooping racemes 7–15 cm long. The fruit is black when ripe, 8 mm diameter, with deciduous sepals; it is strongly astringent due to its tannin content. Its fruit persists for an average of 12.8 days, and always bears a single seed per fruit. The fruit averages 78.4% water, and their dry weight includes 31.3% carbohydrates and 1.3% lipids.

There are two varieties:

- European bird cherry Prunus padus var. padus, Europe and western Asia.
- Asian bird cherry Prunus padus var. commutata, eastern Asia.

== Ecology ==
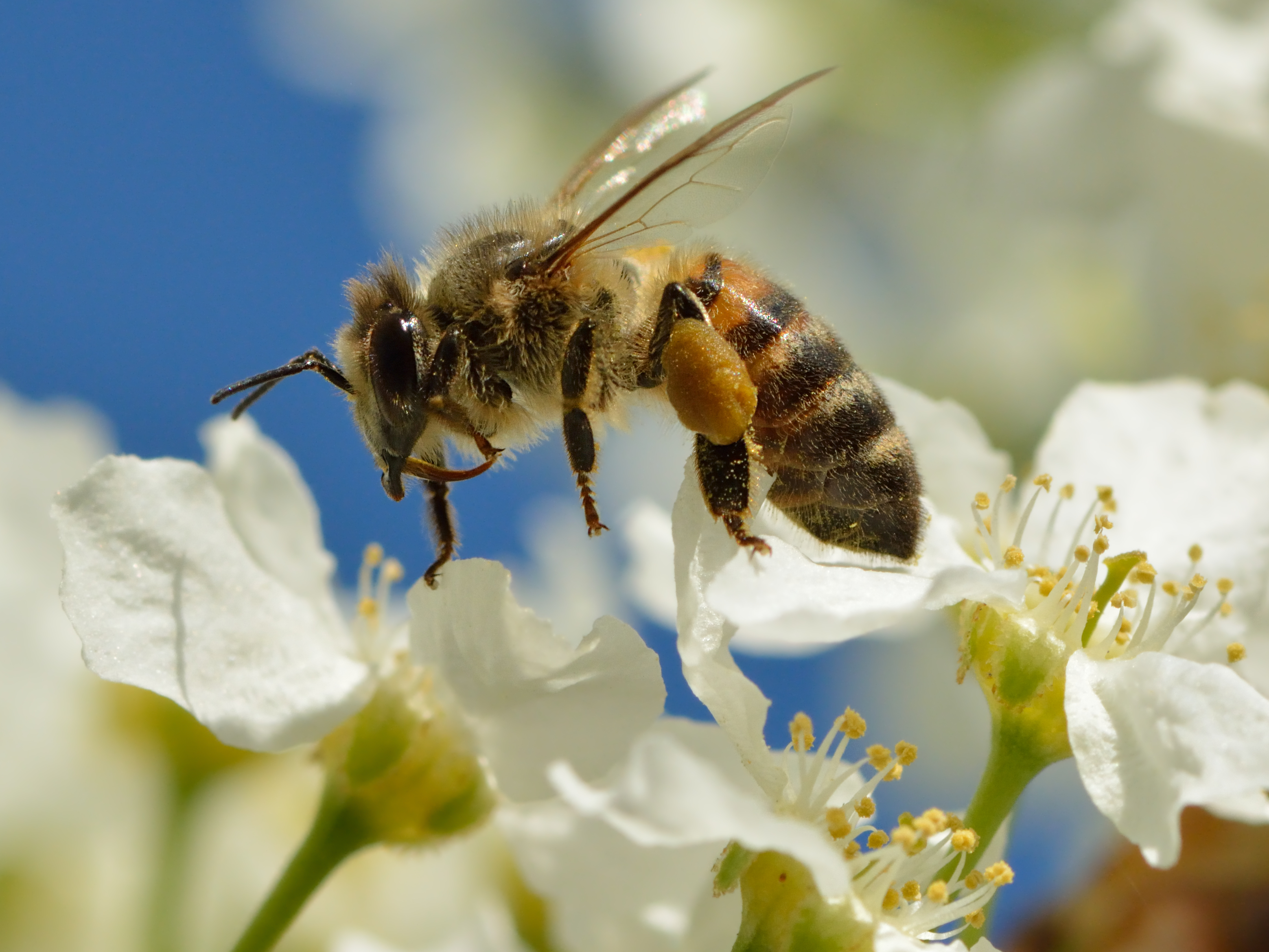
Pollination

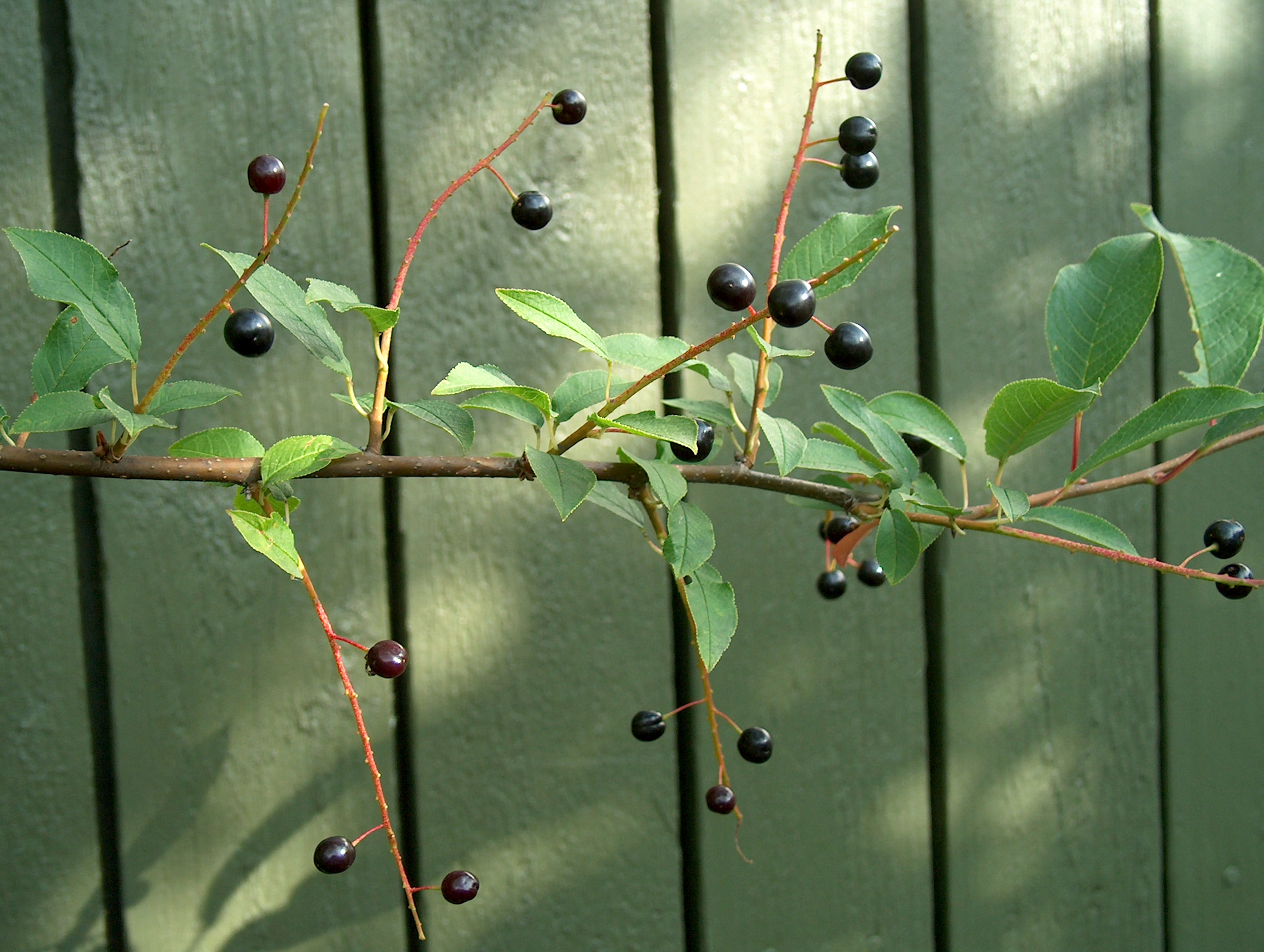
Bird cherries (drupes)

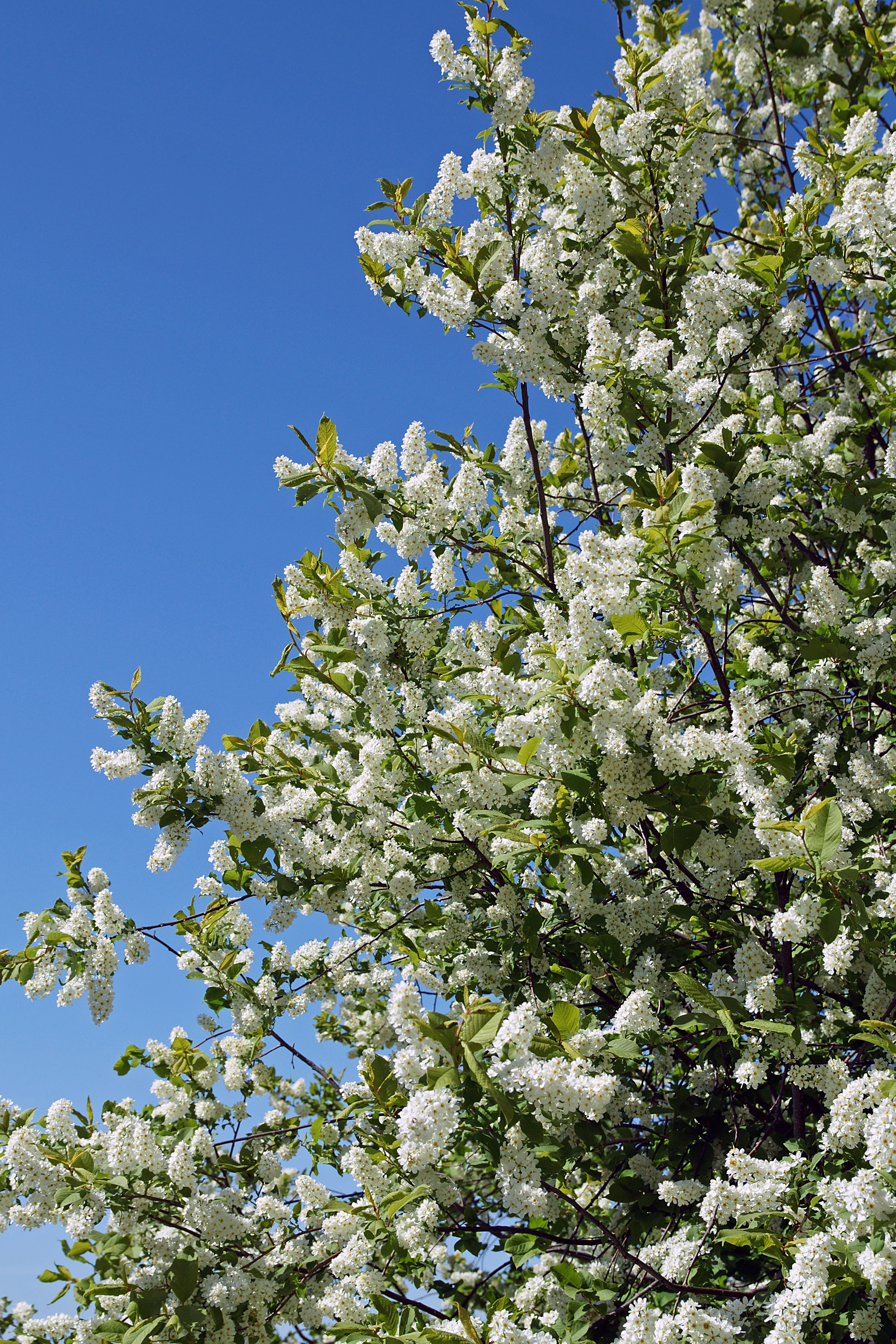
A bird cherry in full bloom

The flowers are hermaphroditic and pollinated by bees and flies. The fruit is readily eaten by birds, which do not perceive astringency as unpleasant.

In Eurasia, the bird-cherry ermine moth (Yponomeuta evonymella) uses bird cherry as its host plant, and the larvae can eat single trees leafless.

== Poison ==
The glycosides prulaurasin and amygdalin, which can be poisonous to some mammals, are present in some parts of P. padus, including the leaves, stems and fruit.

== Cultivation and uses ==
The fruit of this tree is seldom used in western Europe, but, long ago, may possibly have been used as a food far to the east.

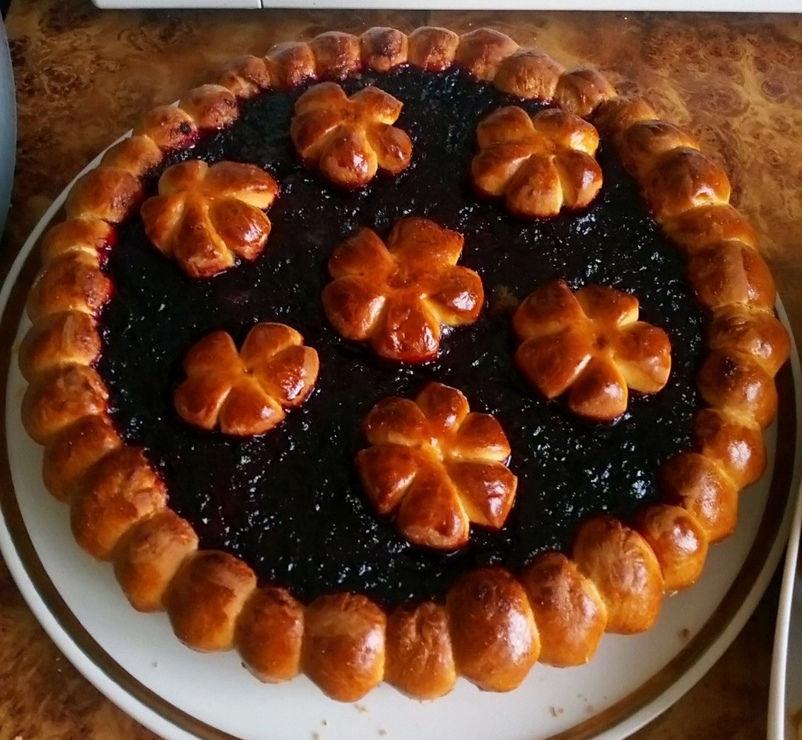
Bird cherry pie, Siberia

In Russia the fruit of the tree is still used for culinary purposes. The dried berries are milled into a flour of variable fineness that forms the principal ingredient of bird-cherry cake. The flour is brown, and so is the cake, even though there is no chocolate in it. Both flour and cake are sold in local stores and bakeries. In a more conventional method of preparation, fresh bird cherries may also be minced and cooked to make jam.

In North America bird cherry is grown as an ornamental tree; it is often attacked by the black knot fungus there.

The variety commutata is sold as an ornamental tree in North America under the common name mayday. It is valued for its hardiness and spring display of fragrant, white flowers. The common name mayday tree refers to the May Day festival, being unrelated to the distress signal mayday. The name for the tree was in use prior to the adoption of "mayday" (the phonetic equivalent of the French m'aider – from venez m'aider, "come [and] help me") as an international distress signal.

== History ==
According to Herodotus (writing around 2500 years ago) a strange race called the Argippaeans, all bald from birth, who lived in an area identifiable possibly as the foothills of the Urals, would pick the bean-sized fruits of a tree called "pontic" and squeeze from them a drinkable black juice, making afterwards, from the residue of the pressing, a type of cake. This juice and the "cakes" produced in its manufacture were, according to Herodotus (who derived his account from the reports of Scythian traders), the main sustenance of the "bald people". According to A. D. Godley, translator of an edition of the works of Herodotus published in the early 1920s, it was said that the Cossacks not only made a similar juice from Prunus padus, but also called it by a name similar to the one (aschu) by which the bald Argippeans called theirs. As might well be expected of so cherry-loving a race, the Argippeans – a just and kindly people – took good care of their trees, protecting them from the harsh winters of their homeland – seemingly by incorporating them (as a central pole symbolising the axis mundi) into the yurt-like felt tents in which they lived:

They dwell each man under a tree, covering it in winter with a white felt cloth, but using no felt in summer. These people are wronged by no man, for they are said to be sacred; nor have they any weapon of war. These are they who judge in the quarrels between their neighbours; moreover, whatever banished man has taken refuge with them is wronged by none.

— Herodotus, Ἱστορίαι (The Histories) Book IV, Chapter 23

== Culture ==
Other vernacular names that have been used for the species include hackberry (unrelated to the genus Celtis), hagberry, and mayday.

In Finland and Sweden, the blooming of bird cherry (Finnish tuomi, Swedish hägg) signifies the start of the summer for many people. In southern Finland, this normally takes place during the two last weeks of May or very early June.

The Ukrainian song Cheremshyna refers to a blooming of bird cherry.

A taboo on the use of the wood of the bird cherry was reported by natives of Advie, in northeast Scotland, who believed it to be a "witches' tree".

The tree was used medicinally during the Middle Ages, during which period it was also believed that the bark of the tree, placed at the door, would ward off plague.

Bird cherry, and the closely related chokecherry P. virginiana, are abundant as introduced invasive species in Anchorage, Alaska, having been planted in great numbers by landscapers and homeowners. They displace native trees and are harmful to moose and to young salmon.

== See also ==
- Taphrina padi – A pocket plum gall that occurs on bird cherry

== Bibliography ==
- Ehrlén, Johan; Eriksson, Ove (1991). "Phenological variation in fruit characteristics in vertebrate-dispersed plants". Oecologia. 86 (4): 463–470. Bibcode:1991Oecol..86..463E. doi:10.1007/BF00318311. ISSN 0029-8549. PMID 28313326.
