= Glasgow Govan =

Glasgow Govan may refer to:

- Glasgow Govan (UK Parliament constituency)
- Glasgow Govan (Scottish Parliament constituency)
- The Govan area of Glasgow
- Govan subway station
