= George Govan =

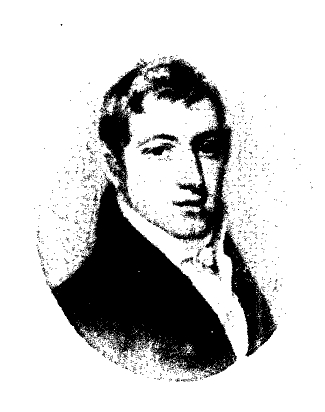
Photograph of a watercolour miniature by William Borthwick Johnstone

George Govan (15 November 1787 – 11 October 1865) was a Scottish physician and naturalist who served in the East India Company and established the Saharanpur botanical garden in India in 1816-17. The plant species Trillium govanianum and Polygonatum govanianum were named in his honour by Nathaniel Wallich.

== Life and work ==
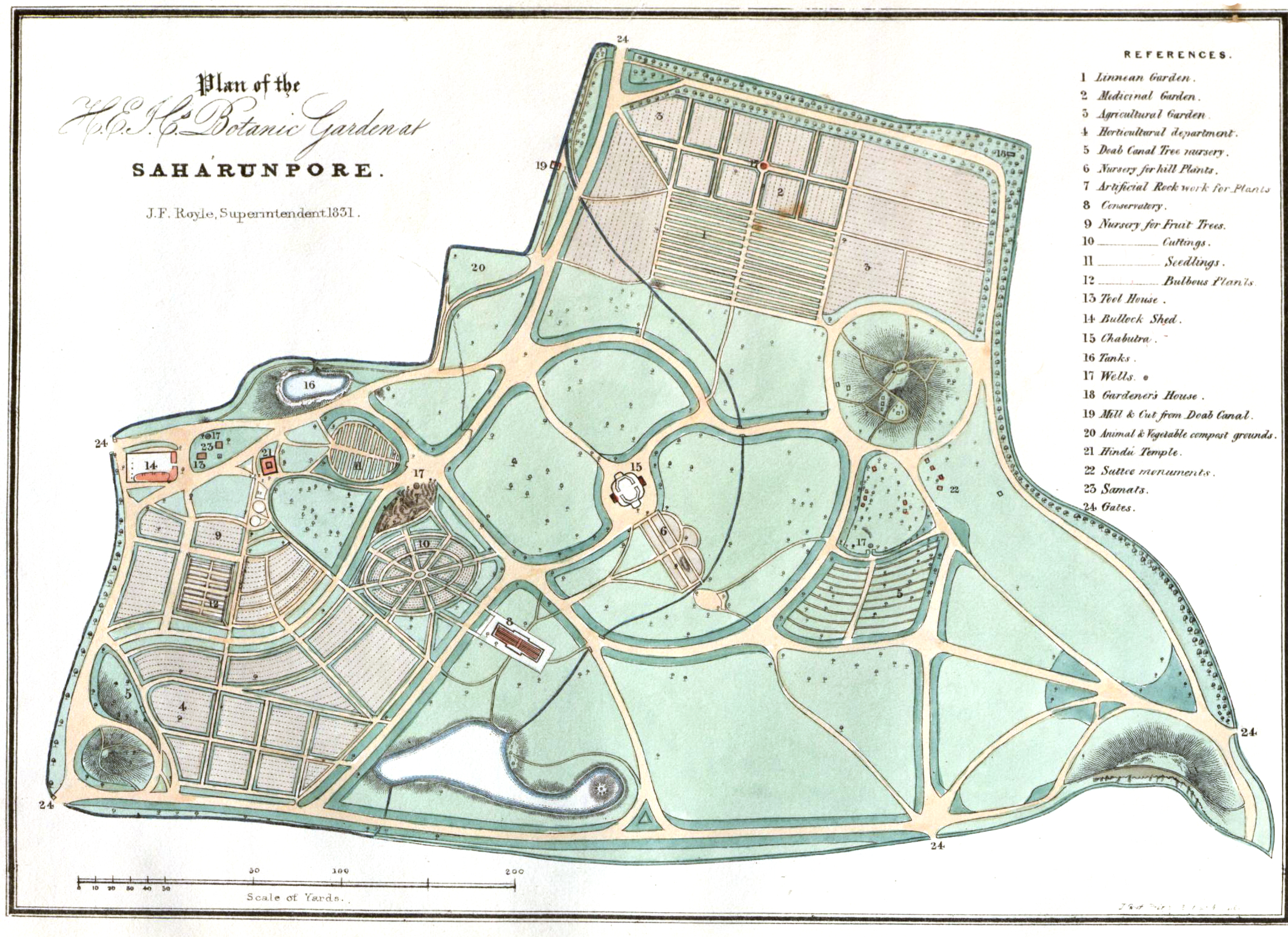
Map of the Saharanpur botanical garden

Govan was born in Cupar, Fife, son of physician John Govan who had studied botany under John Hope. He studied medicine at Edinburgh University with a botanical training under Daniel Rutherford and graduated MD in 1808. He went to join the Bengal Medical Service of the East India Company as an assistant surgeon with a nomination from Charles Grant. He went to Calcutta in 1809 and worked at the Presidency General Hospital before moving to Chunar. He served under Sir David Ochterlony in the Nepal War and was in the Kumaon region until around 1815. He became a civil servant at Saharanpur from June 1815. He noticed a garden called Farhatbaksh which had once belonged to the chieftain Zabita Khan that had been reduced to just a grove of trees. When posted as Agent for the Company in addition to his civil surgeon position, he suggested that it could be converted into a botanical garden. He noted that it would be a peacetime blessing for the people and thereby earn their support. In 1816 he sent the proposal to Lord Hastings and suggested that it was a good location for the introduction of temperate plants due to its proximity to the Himalayas. He was particularly interested in the cultivation of cacao, sarsaparilla, guiacum, cassia, vanilla, and cinchona. He also wanted to experiment with tea and many European vegetables and fruits. Govan was formally appointed superintendent to the gardens on June 13, 1817 and three "chaudharis" (supervisors) and 30 "malis" (gardeners) were employed. Saharanpur became a base during the great trigonometrical survey and Govan accompanied the surveyors Alexander Gerard, John Hodgson, and James Herbert to look for botanical specimens.

Govan fell sick, presumably from malaria, and in 1821 he took sick leave to travel to the Cape of Good Hope and then to Scotland. Govan married Mary, daughter of Charles Maitland-Makgill and a niece of Sir Frederick Maitland, in 1823. He did not return to Saharanpur as he was due for promotion. His position as superintendent and civil surgeon was given to John Forbes Royle on February, 1823. On October 15, 1825 he went to Calcutta with his wife and joined the Bengal Horse Artillery, transferring later to the 17th Native Infantry in Delhi. He was then attached to the Geological Survey of India working in the Himalayas for two years along with Captain James Herbert. In 1827 he accompanied Lord and Lady Amherst on walks in Simla after breakfast, looking at plants. Govan acquired a house in Simla and on March 3, 1829, they had a son George Moncrieff. Victor Jacquemont visited Govan in June 1830 at Simla. In 1832 he took leave and returned home, shortly thereafter taking retirement and settling in Kinross.

Govan collected plant specimens in the Sirmoor state and a part of collection said to have 3500 species was listed by Nathaniel Wallich. Wallich described Hypericum govanianum in Govan's honour but this is now a synonym of H. dyeri. He took them home and after his death, the collection was auctioned in London for 11 shillings to a Russian buyer. Govan's wife Mary had been a trained artist, winning a prize from the Caledonian Horticultural Society in 1814 for a painting of an apple. She made some botanical illustration and the Govans also hired Indian artists to illustrate the local flora. Mary died in 1846 and is buried at Cupar. Their collection of botanical drawings are held at Kew.
