= John Forbes Royle =

British botanist and teacher of materia medica (1798–1858)

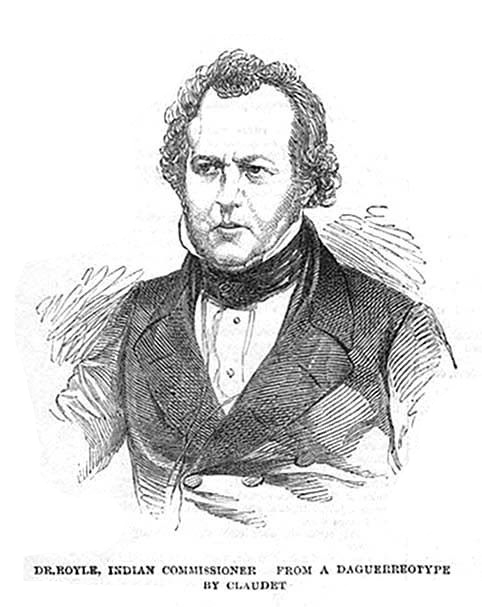
Royle around 1851, redrawn from a daguerreotype

John Forbes Royle (10 May 1798 – 2 January 1858), British botanist and teacher of materia medica (pharmacology), was born in Kanpur (then Cawnpore) in India in 1798. He was in charge of the botanical garden at Saharanpur and played a role in the development of economic botany in India.

== Early life ==
John Forbes Royle was the only son of William Henry Royle and Isabella Forbes. While still a child, his father died and Royle studied under Sangster of Haddington before going to study at Edinburgh high school. He was influenced by Anthony Todd Thomson to take an interest in botany and natural history. This led him to give up a military career at Addiscombe and to choose to study medicine. He joined the service of the East India Company as assistant surgeon and went to Calcutta in 1819. He served with the Bengal army (at various times with the 17th and 87th Regiments, Native Artillery, Cavalry and Infantry) at Dum Dum and in parts of the North-Western Provinces, where he found time to study botany and geology, and made large collections from the Himalayas. He is responsible for introducing Impatiens glandulifera to Britain.

== Saharanpur ==
In 1823 Royle was appointed as the second Superintendent of the botanical garden at Saharanpur which had been established by George Govan of the East India Company in 1816 with the aim of growing medicinal plants and the introduction of new crops of commercial value. Royle was assisted by Hugh Falconer who also took an interest in paleontology. One of Royle's major interests was in the traditional botanical remedies used by Hindu medical practitioners based on which he would later write On the Antiquity of Hindu Medicine (1837). He noted the effectiveness of many of these remedies. He also began a scheme of recording weather data at Saharanpur. He retired from service in 1831 and returned to England but continued to publish several books.

== England ==
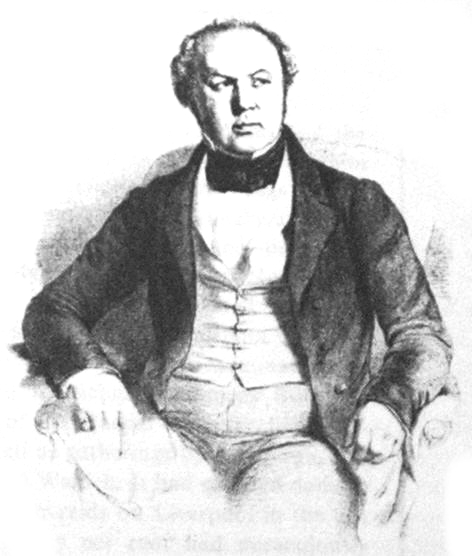
John Forbes Royle (lithograph by G H Ford)

Royle succeeded John Ayrton Paris in 1836 as professor of materia medica at King's College London, a position he held till 1856. He became a fellow of the Linnean Society in 1833 and the Royal Society in 1837. He made use of his collections to publish his Illustrations of the botany and other branches of the natural history of the Himalayan mountains (2 vols., 1839). In this work he suggested the introduction of cinchona to India stating that in "the Neelgherries a favourable site might without doubt be found for the cinchona". In 1851 he superintended the Indian department of the Great Exhibition. In 1852, his recommendation for the introduction of cinchona was approved by the Lord Dalhousie, governor-general of India. Royle produced a report on this in 1853 but work began only in 1860, two years after Royle's death at Acton near London on 2 January 1858.

== Botanical works ==
The work on which Royle's reputation chiefly rests is the Illustrations of the Botany and other branches of Natural History of the Himalayan Mountains, and of the Flora of Cashmere, in 2 vols. begun in 1839. In addition he took a special interest in fibre yielding crops such as cotton in his On the Culture and Commerce of Cotton in India and Elsewhere (1851) and The Fibrous Plants of India fitted for Cordage (1855), together with papers in scientific journals. He contributed most of the plant entries in "The Cyclopedia of Biblical Literature" edited by John Kitto. Royle suggested the idea of state protection for forests in his Essay on the Productive Resources of India (1840). The plant genus Roylea and Royle's pika (Ochotona roylei) are named after him.

Royle's list of publications includes:

- John Forbes Royle. On the antiquity of Hindu Medicine (1837) OL 13110088W
- John Forbes Royle. Illustrations of the botany and other branches of natural history of the Himalayan mountains and of the flora of Cashmere (1839) London: W. H. Allen OL 16846131W
- John Forbes Royle. An essay on the productive resources of India (1840) OL 233715W
- John Forbes Royle. On the culture and commerce of cotton in India and elsewhere (1851) OL 10532009W
- Charles Holtzapffel and John Forbes Royle. Descriptive catalogue of the woods commonly employed in this country for the mechanical and ornamental arts, London: Holtzapffel (1852) OCLC 793593240
- John Forbes Royle. The fibrous plants of India fitted for cordage, clothing, and paper (1855) London: Smith, Elder. OL 10532006W

== Personal life ==
In 1839 he married Annette Solly (1816–1894). They had a daughter Annette Jane and sons Joseph Ralph Edward John, William Henry Lough and Edmund Elphinstone.

The standard author abbreviation Royle is used to indicate this person as the author when citing a botanical name. John Forbes Royle Botanical Garden in Kanpur is named after him.
