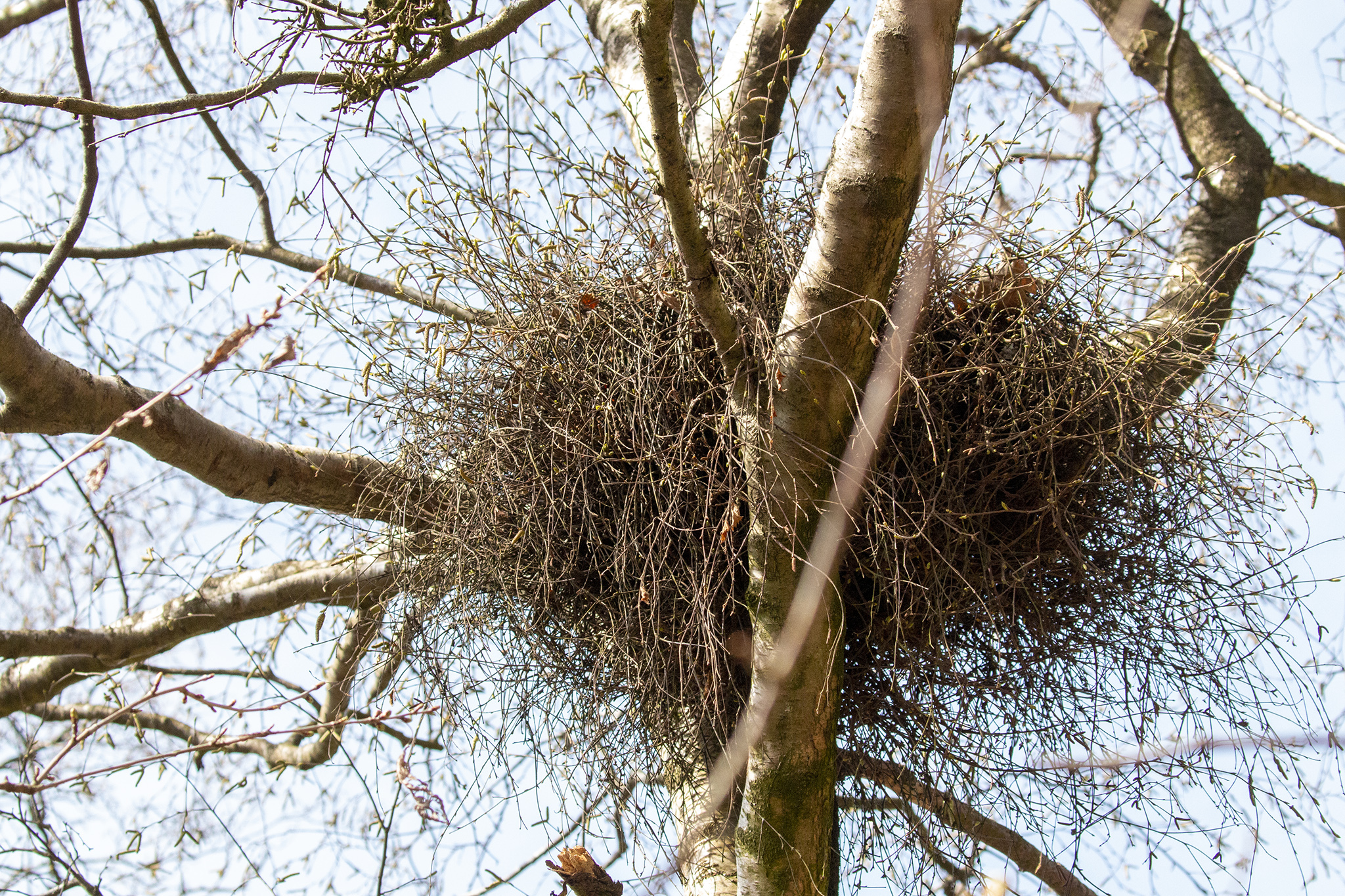

Scientific classification
- Domain: Eukaryota
- Kingdom: Fungi
- Division: Ascomycota
- Class: Taphrinomycetes
- Order: Taphrinales
- Family: Taphrinaceae
- Genus: Taphrina
- Species: T. betulina

Binomial name
- Taphrina betulina Rostr., 1883

Synonyms
- List: Ascomyces turgidus (Sadeb.); Exoascus turgidus Sadeb.; Taphrina betulina Rostrup; Taphrina lagerheimi Palm, 1918; Taphrina turgida (Sadeb.); Taphrina lapponica Juel, 1912; Taphrina willeana Svendsen, 1902; Exoascus turgidus Sadebeck, 1884

= Taphrina betulina =

Birch witches broom

Species of fungus

Taphrina betulina is a fungal plant pathogen that causes the gall, witches broom, which is a chemical infection of birch buds or the developing shoots, leading to a proliferation of growth. It was first described by Emil Rostrup in 1883 and is found in Europe, New Zealand and North America.

== Description ==
Witches broom on birch trees (Betula species), are dense bunches of stunted twigs which look like birds nests. The gall starts as densely packed clusters of buds which can remain for many years. Possibly, when the fungus loses vigour, the buds grow into many slender shoots. In the spring, asci form on small leaves which grow on the shoots. These leaves usually fall before the normal leaves grow elsewhere on the tree. There can be several witches broom in a tree. Witches broom, formed by Taphrina betulina can be found on dwarf birch (Betula nana), Betula nana x pubescens, silver birch (Betula pendula), downy birch (Betula pubescens) and Betula pubescens var.glabrata. A phytoplasma can also form similar looking witches broom on birch.

Witches broom also grow on hornbeam (Carpinus species) and cherry (Prunus species); caused by Taphrina carpini and Taphrina wiesneri respectively.

== Distribution ==
Taphrina betulina has been recorded from Europe, New Zealand and North America.
