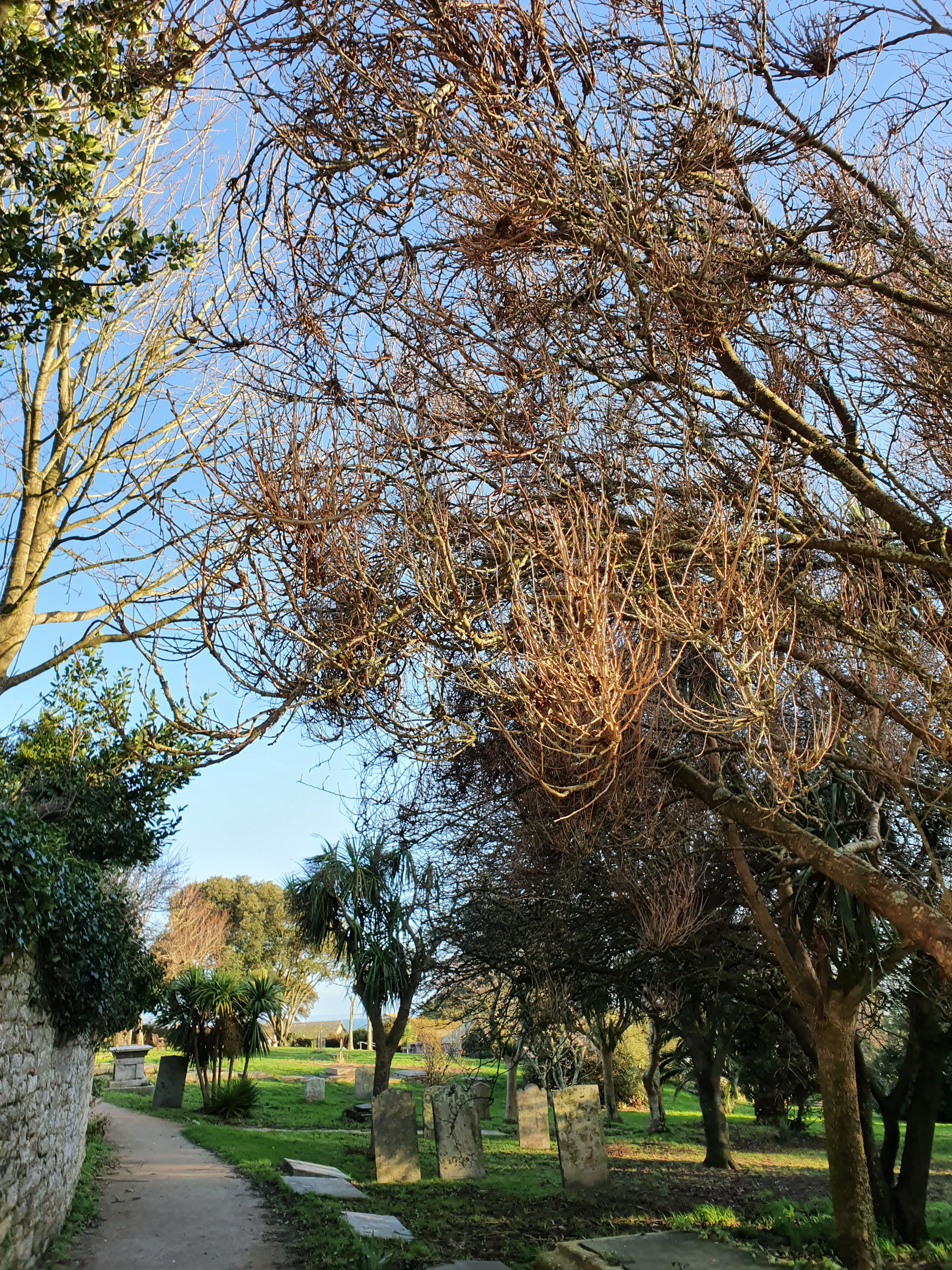

Scientific classification
- Domain: Eukaryota
- Kingdom: Fungi
- Division: Ascomycota
- Class: Taphrinomycetes
- Order: Taphrinales
- Family: Taphrinaceae
- Genus: Taphrina
- Species: T. wiesneri

Binomial name
- Taphrina wiesneri (Rathay) Mix

= Taphrina wiesneri =

Species of fungus

Taphrina wiesneri is a plant pathogen causing witch's broom, or plant gall formations, on cherry trees (Prunus & Cerasus spp). It is an important pest species of the ornamental cherry Cerasus X yedoensis in Japan.

== Life cycle ==
Komatsu et al. found that hyphae of T. wiesneri overwintered in symptomatic shoots of Cerasus × yedoensis. This is in contrast with the overwintering of other Taphrina species such as Taphrina deformans that over winter on leaf and twig surfaces before initiating infection.
