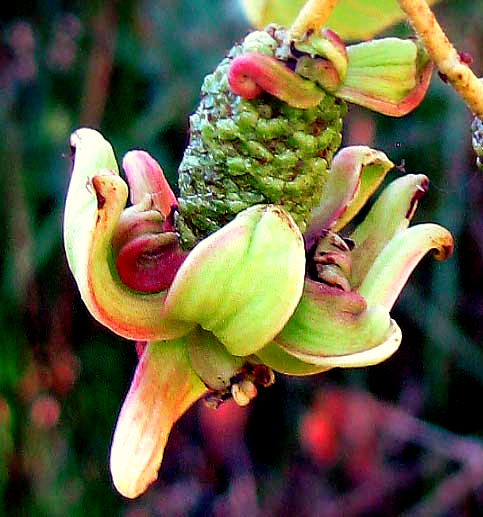
- Taphrina occidentalis gall on White Alder, Alnus rhombifolia

Scientific classification
- Kingdom: Fungi
- Division: Ascomycota
- Class: Taphrinomycetes
- Order: Taphrinales
- Family: Taphrinaceae
- Genus: Taphrina
- Species: T. occidentalis

Binomial name
- Taphrina occidentalis W.W. Ray

= Taphrina occidentalis =

Species of fungus

Taphrina occidentalis is a kind of sac fungus which infects various alder species in Western North America. It causes tongue-shaped enlargements of bracts of the trees' female catkins, as well as small puffed or curled areas on leaves.

== Description ==
Galls and leaf deformations produced by Taphrina occidentalis are not the fungus itself, but rather the effects of the fungus inside the plant tissue. Depending on its stage of life cycle, the fungus manifests in two physical forms:

- As microscopic, filamentous hyphae forming a network of mycelia living parasitically immediately below the plant cuticle
- As one-celled yeasts, the blastospores, in the form of asexual spores produced by budding. The yeast state is saprobic, feeding on dead organic matter or waste by excreting chemicals to digest it.

== Life cycle ==
Here are main features of the life cycle:

- Taphrina occidentalis overwinters in the form of blastospores (similar to conidia, but different because they are yeasts or yeast-like cells). As far as is known, alder catkins and leaves are infected by these blastospores.
- Once infected by blastospores, the fungus' hyphae form a network of mycelia inside the host's tissue.
- From the mycelium, asexual blastospores bud from the hyphae.
- Sexually produced chlamydospores also are produced by the hyphae.
- From these chlamydospores inside the plant's tissue, normally later in the season when unfavorable conditions develop, asci emerge at the tissue's surface.
- These asci are cylindrical to rather club-shaped with a stalk cell commonly broader than long and seated or somewhat inserted between the tissue's surface cells.
- Asci produce eight sexual ascospores, which by definition are genetically distinct haploid propagules.
- In nature, the ascospores bud readily, either within the ascus or after spore expulsion. Early observations concluded that propagation by budding in this "yeast stage" may continue indefinitely, the fungus surviving on various plant surfaces and probably also in the soil.

== Gall seasonality ==
Galls caused by Taphrina occidentalis usually are green with red along the margins, though when fully exposed to sunlight they may be all red. Old, dark brown infected cones may remain on trees for years. Cone galls on alders at low elevations develop by late spring, whereas those on alders at higher elevations develop later. By August, cone galls in the Sierra Nevada and other mountainous areas usually have matured and started to turn brown and wither.

== Occurrence ==
Taphrina occidentalis is known to parasitize four alder species:

- White Alder, Alnus rhombifolia
- Red Alder, Alnus rubra
- Alnus alnobetula (as the Sitka Alder, Alnus alnobetula ssp. sinuata)
- Gray Alder, Alnus incana (as Alnus tenuifolia ssp. tenuifolia

All these species, or the subspecies lumped into them, are native to North America's far western region.

== Impact on tree health ==
Taphrina occidentalis causes the toungue-like galls seen on this page, and leaf deformation sometimes called leaf blister. The galls can prevent or hinder normal fertilization and seed development on the catkins they inhabit. Normally these are not considered as problems needing attention.

== Taxonomy ==
The taxon Taphrina occidentalis was erected in 1939 by W. Winfield Ray. As of April 2026, the taxon Taphrina occidentalis has no synonyms.

=== Etymology ===
The genus name Taphrina is a New Latin construct based on the Greek taphrē, which means "trench, ditch," with the Latin suffix -ina. This may refer to a feature of the deformities caused by some Taphrina species.

The species name occidentalis is Latin meaning "western," in reference to the distribution of this species in western North America.
