= Taphrina ulmi =

Scientific classification
- Domain: Eukaryota
- Kingdom: Fungi
- Division: Ascomycota
- Class: Taphrinomycetes
- Order: Taphrinales
- Family: Taphrinaceae
- Genus: Taphrina
- Species: T. ulmi

Binomial name
- Taphrina ulmi (Fuckel) Johanson (1886)

Synonyms
- Exoascus ulmi Fuckel (1874)

Species of fungus

Taphrina ulmi is a species of fungus in the family Taphrinaceae. A plant pathogen, it causes leaf blister galls on elm (Ulmus sp.) trees.
