= Taphrina maculans =

Scientific classification
- Domain: Eukaryota
- Kingdom: Fungi
- Division: Ascomycota
- Class: Taphrinomycetes
- Order: Taphrinales
- Family: Taphrinaceae
- Genus: Taphrina
- Species: T. maculans

Binomial name
- Taphrina maculans E.J.Butler (1911)

Species of fungus

Taphrina maculans is a fungal plant pathogen that is the causative agent of leaf blotch of turmeric plants. It has been reported from Bangladesh and India. The fungus was first described scientifically by Irish mycologist Edwin John Butler in 1911.
