= Taphrina potentillae =

Scientific classification
- Domain: Eukaryota
- Kingdom: Fungi
- Division: Ascomycota
- Class: Taphrinomycetes
- Order: Taphrinales
- Family: Taphrinaceae
- Genus: Taphrina
- Species: T. potentillae

Binomial name
- Taphrina potentillae (Farl.) Johanson (1886)

Synonyms
- Exoascus deformans var. potentillae Farl. (1883); Ascomyces potentillae (Farl.) W.Phillips (1887); Exoascus potentillae (Farl.) Sacc. (1889); Exoascus potentillae (Farl.) Sacc. (1889); Taphrina tormentillae Rostr.

Species of fungus

Taphrina potentillae is a species of fungus in the family Taphrinaceae. A plant pathogen, it infects the flowers and leaves of species of the genera Potentilla and Parageum. The species was first described under the name Exoascus deformans var. potentillae by American botanist William Farlow in 1883.
