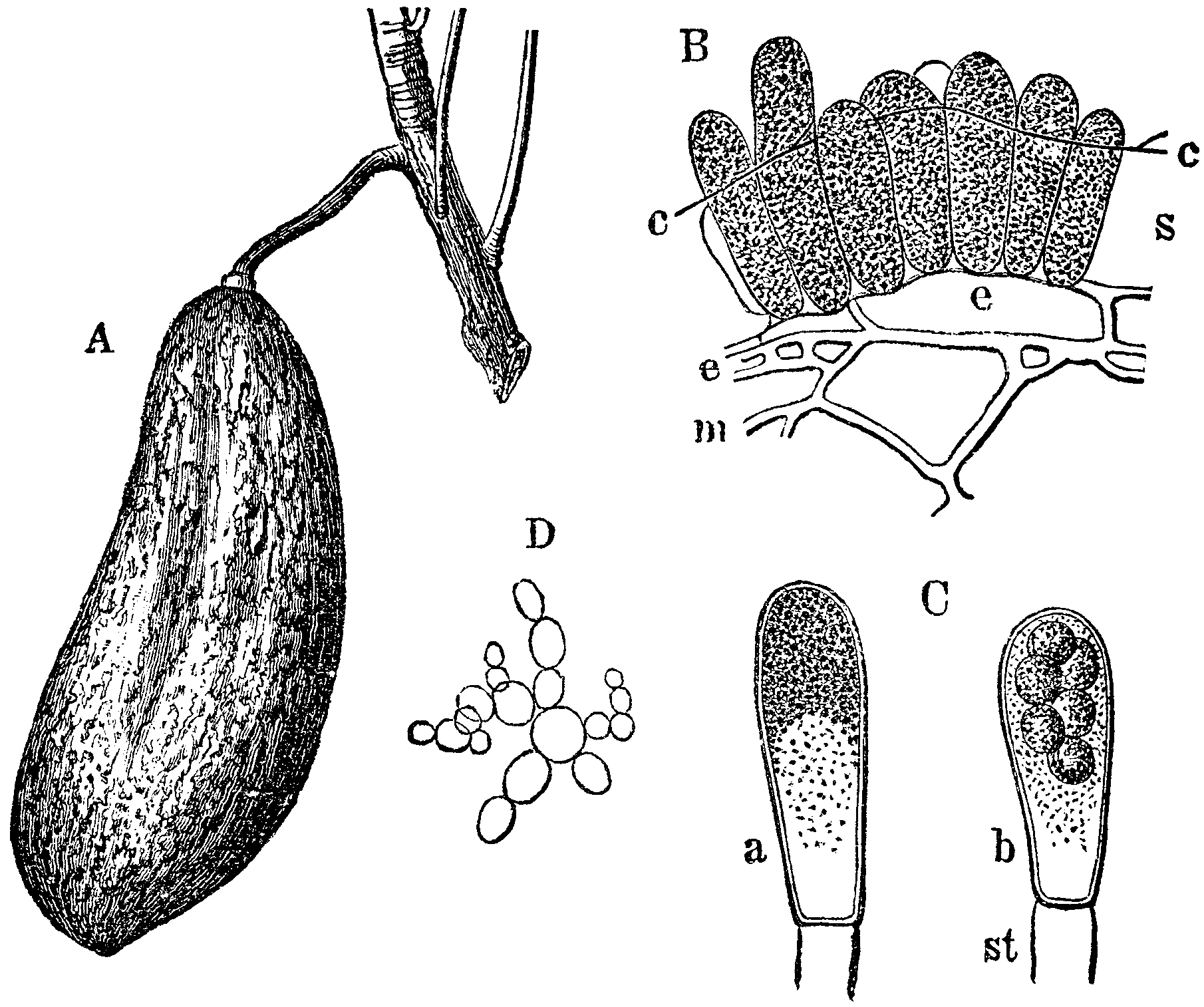
- Taphrina pruni

Scientific classification
- Kingdom: Fungi
- Division: Ascomycota
- Class: Taphrinomycetes
- Order: Taphrinales
- Family: Taphrinaceae
- Genus: Taphrina; Fr. (1815)

Type species
- Taphrina aurea (Pers.) Fr. (1815)

Synonyms
- Ascomyces Mont. & Desm. Ascosporium Berk. Entomospora Sacc. ex Jacz. Exoascus Fuckel; Magnusiella Sadeb. Sarcorhopalum Rabenh. Taphria Fr.

= Taphrina =

Genus of fungi

Taphrina is a fungal genus within the Ascomycota that causes leaf and catkin curl diseases and witch's brooms of certain flowering plants. One of the more commonly observed species causes peach leaf curl. Taphrina typically grow as yeasts during one phase of their life cycles, then infect plant tissues in which typical hyphae are formed, and ultimately they form a naked layer of asci on the deformed, often brightly pigmented surfaces of their hosts. No discrete fruit body is formed outside of the gall-like or blister-like tissues of the hosts. The asci form a layer lacking paraphyses, and they lack croziers. The ascospores frequently bud into multiple yeast cells within the asci. Phylogenetically, Taphrina is a member of a basal group within the Ascomycota, and type genus for the subphylum Taphrinomycotina, the class Taphrinomycetes, and order Taphrinales.

== Species ==
As of April, 2026, Index Fungorum listed the following accepted species:

- Taphrina aceris (Dearn. & Barthol.) Mix 1936
- Taphrina aesculi (Ellis & Everh.) Giesenh. 1895
- Taphrina alni (Berk. & Broome) Gjaerum 1966
- Taphrina alni-japonicae Nishida 1911
- Taphrina amelanchieris Mix 1939
- Taphrina americana Mix 1947
- Taphrina amplians Mix 1939
- Taphrina andina Palm 1909
- Taphrina antarctica Selbmann & Turchetti 2014
- Taphrina armeniacae Georgescu & Badea 1937
- Taphrina arrabidae (Á. Fonseca, J. Inácio & M.G. Rodrigues) Onofri & Zucconi 2017
- Taphrina athyrii Siemaszko 1923
- Taphrina atkinsonii W.W. Ray 1939
- Taphrina bartholomaei Mix 1949
- Taphrina bergeniae Döbbeler 1979
- Taphrina betulae (Fuckel) Johanson 1886
- Taphrina betulicola Nishida 1911
- Taphrina betulina Rostr. 1883
- Taphrina blechni Bres. ex Mix 1947
- Taphrina borealis Johanson 1886
- Taphrina boycei Mix 1939
- Taphrina bullata (Berk.) Tul. 1866
- Taphrina caerulescens (Desm. & Mont.) Tul. 1866
- Taphrina californica Mix 1938
- Taphrina candicans Sacc. 1878
- Taphrina carnea Johanson 1886
- Taphrina carpini (Rostr.) Johanson 1886
- Taphrina carveri Jenkins 1939
- Taphrina castanopsidis Ellis & Everh. ex Jenkins 1939
- Taphrina cerasi (Fuckel) Sadeb. 1890
- Taphrina cerasi-microcarpae (Kuschke) Laubert 1928
- Taphrina cissi Zoll. 1847
- Taphrina communis (Sadeb.) Giesenh. 1895
- Taphrina confusa (G.F. Atk.) Giesenh. 1895
- Taphrina cornu-cervi Giesenh. 1892
- Taphrina coryli Nishida 1911
- Taphrina crataegi Sadeb. 1890
- Taphrina cystopteridis Mix 1938
- Taphrina darkeri Mix 1947
- Taphrina dearnessii Jenkins 1939
- Taphrina deformans (Berk.) Tul. 1866
- Taphrina ecuadorensis Syd. 1939
- Taphrina entomospora Thaxt. 1910
- Taphrina farlowii Sadeb. 1890
- Taphrina faulliana Mix 1938
- Taphrina filicina Rostr. 1886
- Taphrina flavoaurea (Cocc.) Laubert 1928
- Taphrina flavorubra W.W. Ray 1939
- Taphrina flectens Mix 1939
- Taphrina fuegiana (Speg.) E.K. Cash 1972
- Taphrina fulgens (Cooke & Harkn.) Jacz. 1926
- Taphrina gei-montani Bacigálová & Petrýd. 2016
- Taphrina gracilis Mix 1938
- Taphrina higginsii Mix 1947
- Taphrina hiratsukae Nishida 1911
- Taphrina inositophila (Á. Fonseca, J. Inácio & M.G. Rodrigues) Yurkov & Buzzini 2017
- Taphrina jaczewskii Palm 1918
- Taphrina japonica Kusano 1905
- Taphrina jenkinsiana Mix 1954
- Taphrina johansonii Sadeb. 1891
- Taphrina klebahnii Wieben 1927
- Taphrina kruchii (Vuill.) Sacc. 1892
- Taphrina kurtzmanii (Á. Fonseca, J. Inácio & M.G. Rodrigues) Turchetti & Cecchini 2017
- Taphrina kusanoi Ikeno 1903
- Taphrina lagerheimii Palm 1918
- Taphrina lapponica Juel 1912
- Taphrina lata Palm 1918
- Taphrina laurencia Giesenh. 1892
- Taphrina letifera (Peck) Sacc. 1892
- Taphrina linearis Syd. & P. Syd. 1914
- Taphrina macrophylla W.W. Ray 1940
- Taphrina maculans E.J. Butler 1911
- Taphrina media Palm 1918
- Taphrina mexicana Syd. & P. Syd. 1921
- Taphrina mirabilis (G.F. Atk.) Giesenh. 1895
- Taphrina moriformis Bubák 1906
- Taphrina mume Nishida 1911
- Taphrina nana Johanson 1886
- Taphrina nepalensis Y. Otani & Bhandary 1982
- Taphrina nikkoensis Kusano 1907
- Taphrina occidentalis W.W. Ray 1939
- Taphrina oreoselini C. Massal. 1889
- Taphrina orientalis Mix 1947
- Taphrina osmundae Nishida 1911
- Taphrina padi (Jacz.) Mix 1947
- Taphrina polystichi Mix 1938
- Taphrina populina Fr. 1815
- Taphrina populi-salicis Mix 1947
- Taphrina pruni (Fuckel) Tul. 1866
- Taphrina pruni-acidae (Jacz.) Mix 1936
- Taphrina pruni-subcordatae (Zeller) Mix 1936
- Taphrina pteridis Viégas 1944
- Taphrina purpurascens B.L. Rob. 1887
- Taphrina quercina J.C. Schmidt 1823
- Taphrina randiae Rehm 1901
- Taphrina reichei Werderm. 1922
- Taphrina rhaetica Volkart 1903
- Taphrina rhizophora Johanson 1887
- Taphrina rhomboidalis Syd., P. Syd. & E.J. Butler 1911
- Taphrina robinsoniana Giesenh. 1895
- Taphrina rostrupiana (Sadeb.) Giesenh. 1895
- Taphrina rugosa W.W. Ray 1939
- Taphrina sacchari Jenkins 1938
- Taphrina sadebeckii Johanson 1886
- Taphrina sebastianiae (Sadeb.) Jacz. 1926
- Taphrina siemaszkoi Mix 1936
- Taphrina sorbi (Jacz.) Mix 1936
- Taphrina splendens Palm 1918
- Taphrina struthiopteridis Nishida 1911
- Taphrina thaxteri Mix 1939
- Taphrina thomasii Mix 1947
- Taphrina tonduziana Henn. 1902
- Taphrina tormentillae Rostr. 1885
- Taphrina tosquinetii (Westend.) Magnus 1890
- Taphrina truncicola Kusano 1905
- Taphrina ulmi (Fuckel) Johanson 1886
- Taphrina umbelliferarum Rostr. 1883
- Taphrina unilateralis (Peck) Laubert 1928
- Taphrina varia (G.F. Atk.) Laubert 1928
- Taphrina veronaerambellii (Á. Fonseca, J. Inácio & M.G. Rodrigues) Selbmann & Cecchini 2017
- Taphrina vestergrenii Giesenh. 1901
- Taphrina virginica Seym. & Sadeb. 1895
- Taphrina viridis (Sadeb.) Maire 1912
- Taphrina wettsteiniana Herzfeld 1910
- Taphrina whetzelii Mix 1957
- Taphrina wiesneri (Ráthay) Mix 1954
- Taphrina willeana C.J. Svendsen 1902
