= Taphrina johansonii =

Scientific classification
- Domain: Eukaryota
- Kingdom: Fungi
- Division: Ascomycota
- Class: Taphrinomycetes
- Order: Taphrinales
- Family: Taphrinaceae
- Genus: Taphrina
- Species: T. johansonii

Binomial name
- Taphrina johansonii Sadebeck, (1890)

Species of fungus

Taphrina johansonii is an ascomycete fungus that is a plant pathogen. It causes "tongue" galls on poplar trees.
