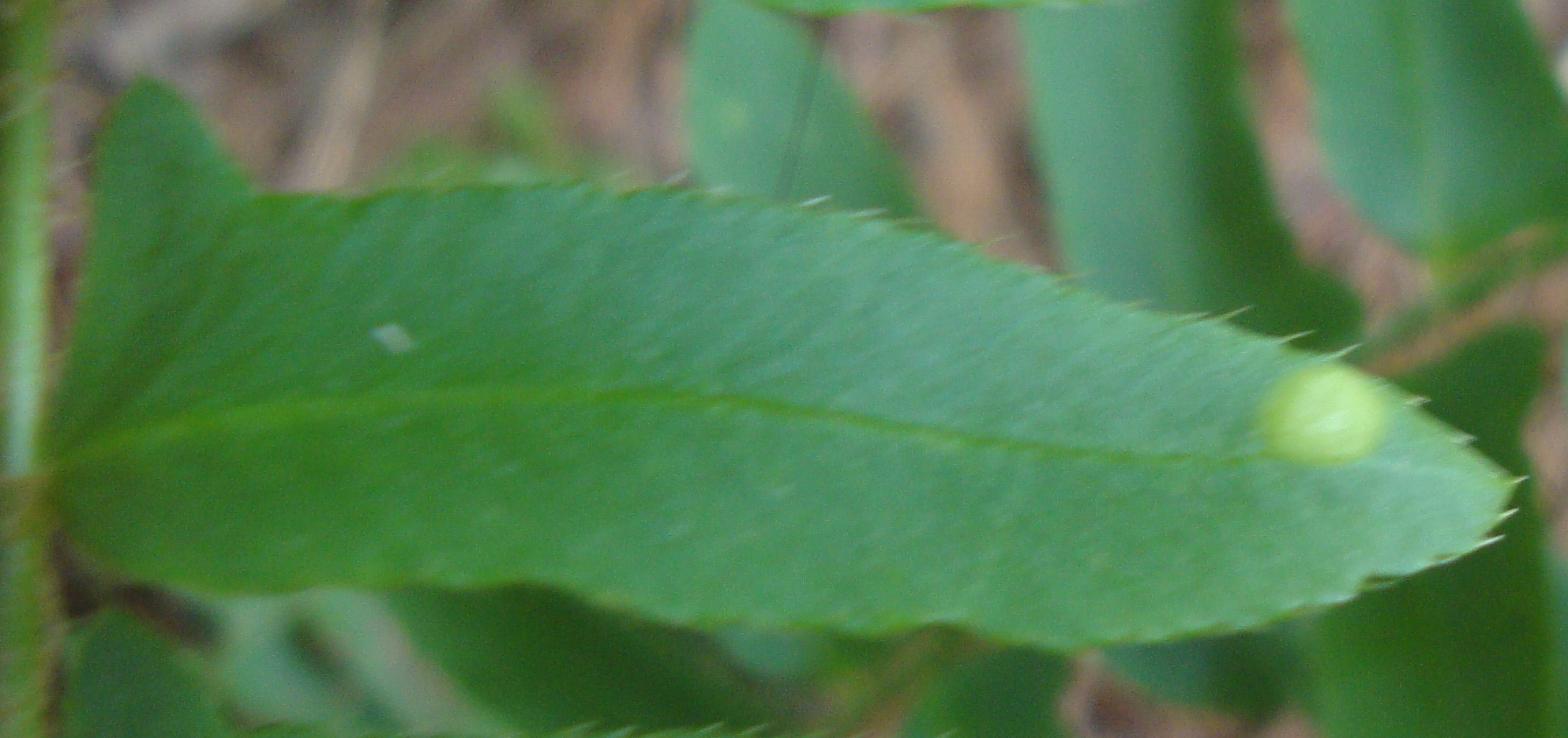
- Pinnule of Polystichum acrostichoides with Taphrina polystichi producing a light green spot at the tip.

Scientific classification
- Kingdom: Fungi
- Division: Ascomycota
- Class: Taphrinomycetes
- Order: Taphrinales
- Family: Taphrinaceae
- Genus: Taphrina
- Species: T. polystichi

Binomial name
- Taphrina polystichi A. J. Mix

= Taphrina polystichi =

Species of fungus

Taphrina polystichi is an ascomycete fungus that parasitizes Christmas fern (Polystichum acrostichoides) in eastern North America. It was described by A. J. Mix in 1938.

== Taxonomy ==
Taphrina polystichi was described in A. J. Mix in 1938. Mix notes that the fungus was originally identified as Exoascus filicinus by Coker, though this is not listed as a synonym of the species. A molecular phylogenetic study of the genus suggested that T. polystichi and T. virginica were conspecific. However, the authors described a new species based on the strains of T. polystichi and T. virginica in a later study using molecular phylogenetics and physiology, but they did not synonymize the taxa.

== Description ==
Taphrina polystichi causes 0.5 to 1 cm, yellowish or whitish swollen spots on leaves. Ascogenous cells are produced on both sides of the leaf, but asci are only produced on the upper leaf surface. Asci are stalked and are 30-46 by 4-8 micrometers. Ascospores are elliptic and 3-6 by 2-4 micrometers. In a trials of nitrogen utilization, T. polystichi was able to use ammonium chloride, ammonium citrate, ammonium nitrate, ammonium sulfate, magnesium nitrate, potassium nitrate, sodium nitrate, dl-alpha alanine, l-arginine, dl-aspartic acid, l-glutamic acid, dl-histidine, and dl-valine. In trials of carbon utilization, T. polystichi was able to use dextrose, sucrose, maltose, melezitose, trehalose, dextrin, inulin, and mannitol. It was unable to use lactose, rhamnose, inositol, i-erythritol, xylose, and succinic acid. The ability to use mannitol and the inability to use xylose and succinic acid distinguished it from the other species tested.
