= Taphrina coryli =

Scientific classification
- Kingdom: Fungi
- Division: Ascomycota
- Class: Taphrinomycetes
- Order: Taphrinales
- Family: Taphrinaceae
- Genus: Taphrina
- Species: T. coryli

Binomial name
- Taphrina coryli Nishida, (1911)

Species of fungus

Taphrina coryli is an ascomycete fungus that is a plant pathogen. It causes leaf blister on common hazelnut.
