= Taphrina aurea =

Scientific classification
- Domain: Eukaryota
- Kingdom: Fungi
- Division: Ascomycota
- Class: Taphrinomycetes
- Order: Taphrinales
- Family: Taphrinaceae
- Genus: Taphrina
- Species: T. aurea

Binomial name
- Taphrina aurea (Pers.) Fr.

Species of fungus

Taphrina aurea is an ascomycete fungus that is a plant pathogen. It causes leaf blisters on poplar trees.
