= Taphrina entomospora =

Scientific classification
- Domain: Eukaryota
- Kingdom: Fungi
- Division: Ascomycota
- Class: Taphrinomycetes
- Order: Taphrinales
- Family: Taphrinaceae
- Genus: Taphrina
- Species: T. entomospora

Binomial name
- Taphrina entomospora Thaxt. (1910)

Synonyms
- Entomospora antarctica Sacc. ex Jacz. (1927)); Exoascus entomosporus (Thaxt.) Sacc. & Trotter (1913)

Species of fungus

Taphrina entomospora is a fungal plant pathogen that infects the leaves of Nothofagus. T. entomospora infection results in chlorosis and changes in parenchyma structure of the leaf causing premature senescence. The species was first described scientifically by mycologist Roland Thaxter in 1910.

The distribution of T. entomospora is restricted to South America.
