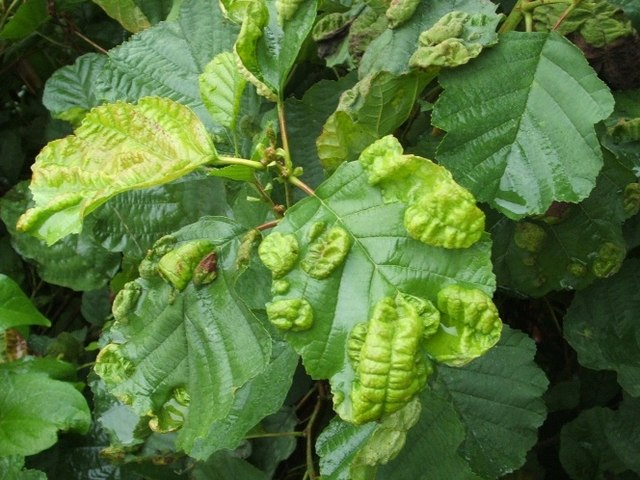

Scientific classification
- Domain: Eukaryota
- Kingdom: Fungi
- Division: Ascomycota
- Class: Taphrinomycetes
- Order: Taphrinales
- Family: Taphrinaceae
- Genus: Taphrina
- Species: T. tosquinetii

Binomial name
- Taphrina tosquinetii (Westendorp) Tulasne, 1866

Synonyms
- Ascomyces tosquinetii Westend., 1861; Exoascus tosquinetii (Westend.) Syd. & P. Syd.

= Taphrina tosquinetii =

Species of fungus

Taphrina tosquinetii is a fungal plant pathogen that causes large blisters on both surfaces of the leaves of alder.

== Description of the gall ==
The ascomycete induces a gall that distorts the leaves of alder. The leaves are slightly thickened, brittle and incurved with blister-like growth on both sides, which can increase the size of an infected leaf to twice the normal size. Later the leaf tissue becomes pale and thin with a whitish bloom when the asci develop. Species infected include common alder (Alnus glutinosa), grey alder (Alnus incana) and Alnus x pubescens.
