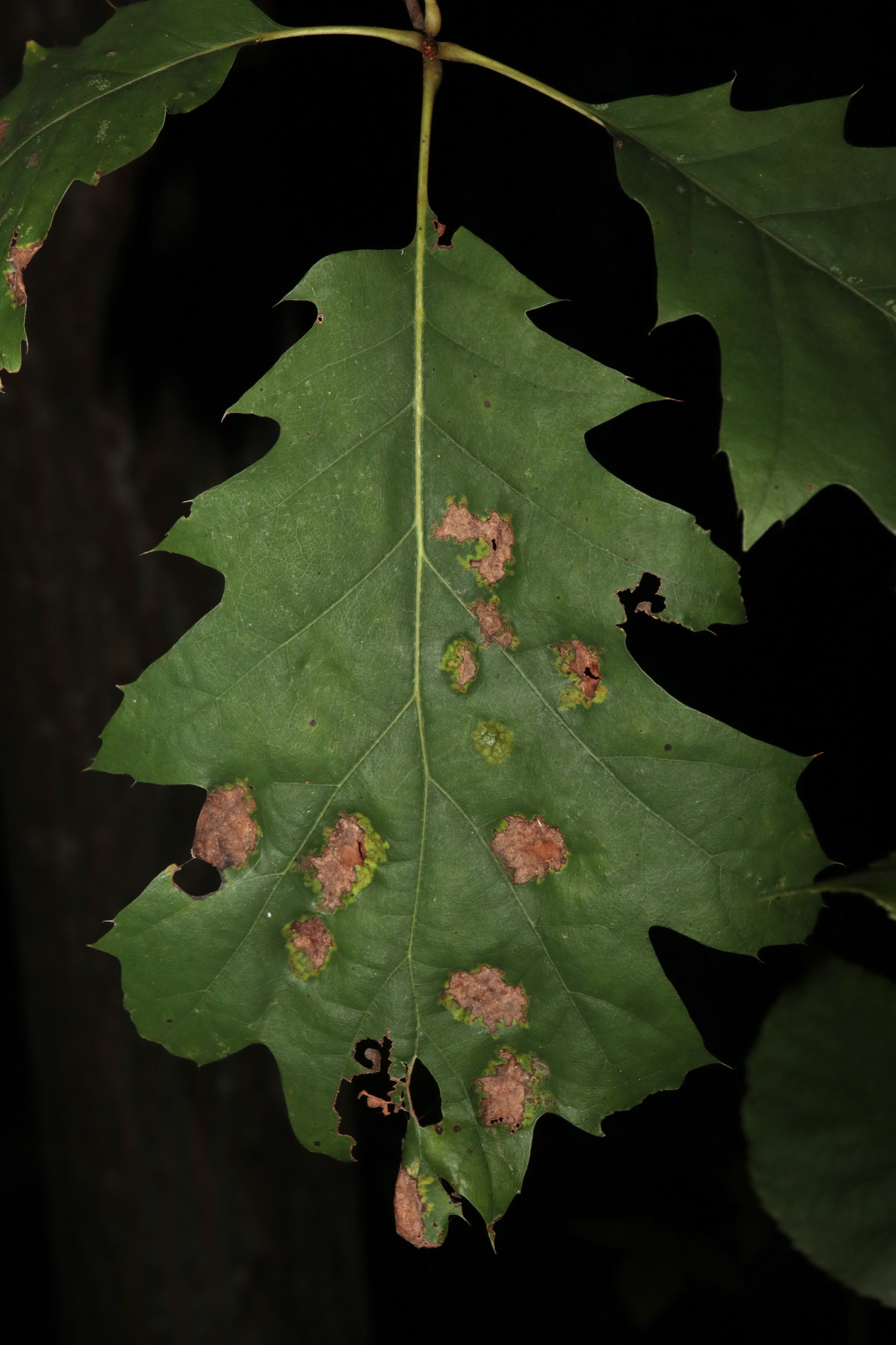
- Symptomatic blisters of Taphrina caerulescens on oak

Scientific classification
- Kingdom: Fungi
- Division: Ascomycota
- Class: Taphrinomycetes
- Order: Taphrinales
- Family: Taphrinaceae
- Genus: Taphrina
- Species: T. caerulescens

Binomial name
- Taphrina caerulescens (Desm. & Mont.) Tul. (1866)

Synonyms
- Ascomyces caerulescens Desm. & Mont. (1848)

= Taphrina caerulescens =

Species of fungus

Taphrina caerulescens is a species of fungus in the family Taphrinaceae. It is a pathogenic Ascomycete fungus that causes oak leaf blister disease on various species of oak trees (Quercus spp.). The associated anamorph species is Lalaria coccinea, described in 1990. This disease causes lesions and blisters on Oak leaves. Effects of the disease are mostly cosmetic. Although not taxonomically defined, strains of T. caerulescens have been shown to be host specific with varying ¬ascus morphology between strains. There are differences in strains' abilities to metabolize various carbon and nitrogen compounds. This has been proposed as a method of taxonomically defining subspecies within T. caerulescens.

Taphrina caerulescens is very closely related to Taphrina deformans, which causes peach leaf curl. These two pathogens have indistinguishable asci. However, T. deformans infects peach tree species while T. caerulescens infects Oak tree species only.

== Hosts and symptoms ==
Taphrina caerulescens infects about 50 different species of oak (Quercus), predominately red oak (Q. erythrobalanus) and some white oak (Q. leurobalanus). Oak leaf blister is found across the country and in varying parts of the world but is most severe in the southeast and Gulf States of the U.S. It is generally accepted that a T. caerulescens strain isolated from one host cannot be used to infect a different host species. This indicates that there are a number of different strains within T. caerulescens. For instance, it has been observed where a single, heavily infected oak tree of one species is surrounded by various other susceptible oak species which remain symptom-less of oak leaf blister the entire season. In a study by Taylor & Birdwell, pathogen isolates from water, live, and southern red oak were used to inoculate the host live oak. Asci developed on the live oak only from pathogen isolates originating from the live oak, further indicating host specificity. The extent of strains' host specificity is not fully known and no taxonomic specifications are in place to name these strains. Various strains have also been shown to differ in their nitrogen and carbon compound metabolic profiles

== Symptoms ==
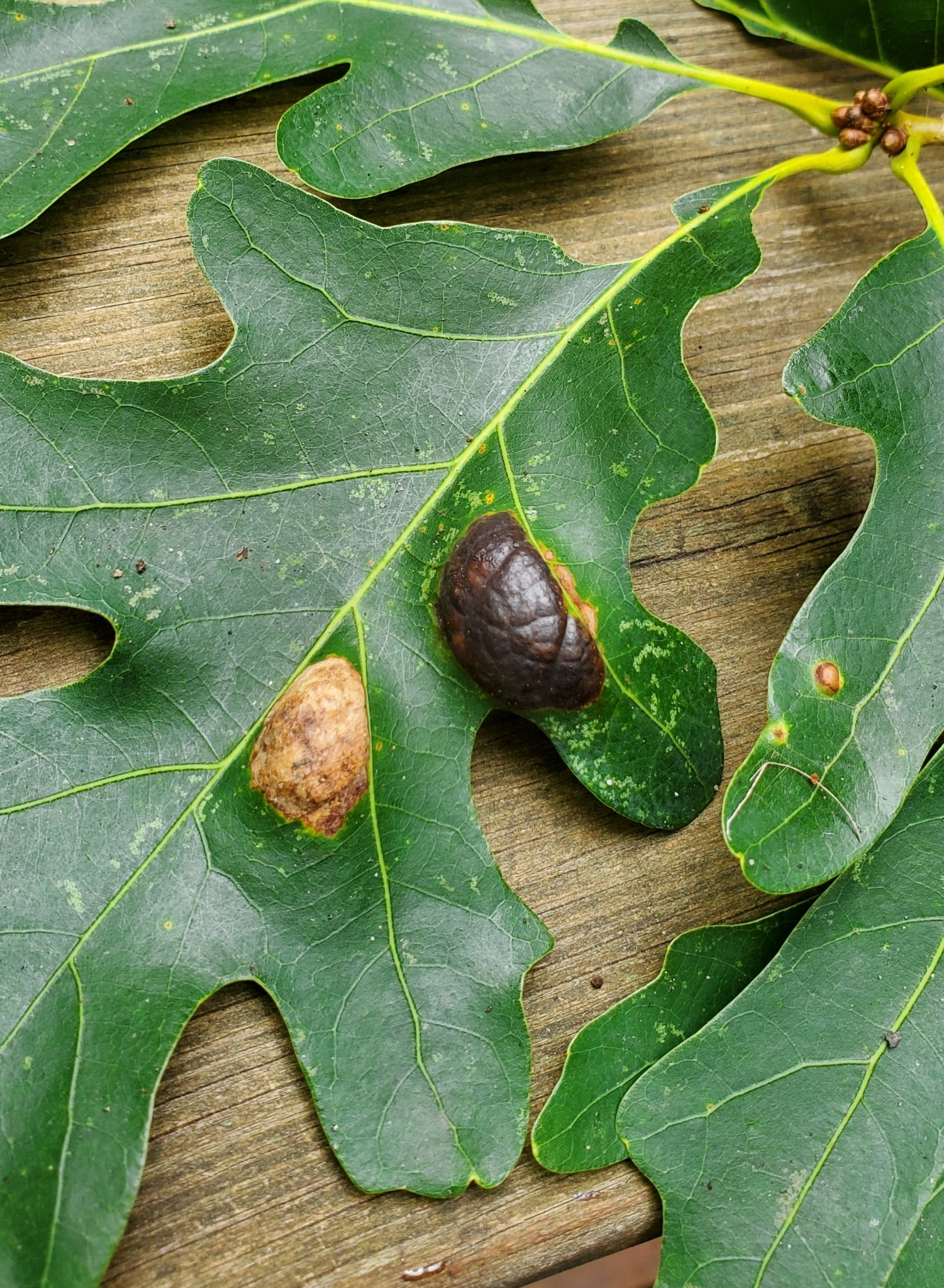
Oak leaf canker

In the lab, symptoms develop about four weeks after inoculation. In the field, symptoms are most prominent on the top side of the leaf. Grey lesions 3–20 mm in diameter appear in early spring on the bottom side of the leaf with blisters or bulges up to 1/2 in (13 mm) high on the top side of the leaf. By midsummer these lesions may coalesce causing significant amounts of necrosis per leaf. This can cause the leaf to curl as well as premature defoliation (more common where disease is more severe) upwards of 85%. Top side chlorosis normally corresponds with the lesions on the bottom side of the leaf. Reduced overall growth of the tree may result, but is not common.

== Microscopic symptoms ==
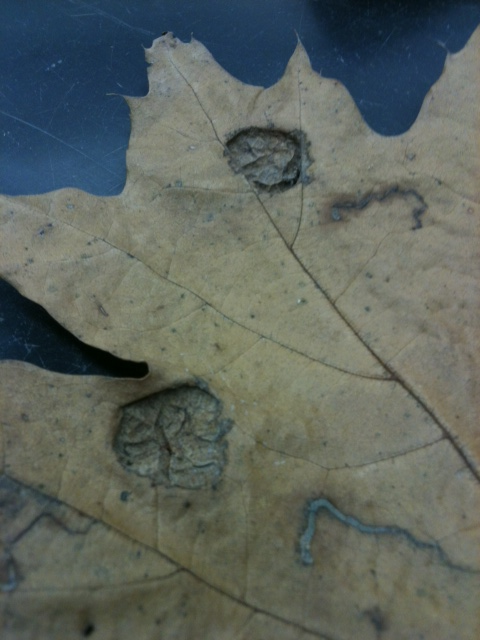
Blisters of Taphrina caerulescens seen on underside of oak leaf

Cells around the blisters resemble meristematic cells with denser cytoplasms and smaller vacuoles. Mycelial development is sparse on the leaf surface. Hyphae growth is subcuticle and intercellular in the epidermal layer. There is no evidence of hyphae growing into the mesophyll layer nor into epidermal and cuticle layers beyond the lesions whereas T. deformans does cross into the mesophyll layer. Lower epidermal cells in diseased tissue are elongated. Anticlinal divisions are likely while periclinal and oblique divisions are definitive. There are no observable effects on guard cells. Cells in the mesophyll layer remain mostly unchanged; there is a slight reduction [chloroplast] number in palisade cells. Occasional degenerate chloroplasts and slightly lower number in mesophyll cells.

The upper epidermal cells appear to remain relatively normal as well, as hyphal growth goes below this layer. Healthy epidermal cells contain a large central vacuole surrounded by a thin cytoplasmic layer with endoplasmic reticulum, chloroplasts with well-developed grana, starch granules, and osmophilic globules. Other organelles are infrequently present as well. Epidermal cells of diseased tissue have highly irregular cell walls. The most dramatic changes were within the cell. The large central vacuole is replaced with a number of small irregularly shaped vacuoles containing a highly electron dense material. Nuclei are enlarged, plus a 2-3 fold increase in the number of organelles normally present in these cell types. Chloroplasts become large and irregular with large starch granules inside of them as well as other internal alterations to the chloroplasts. These alterations indicate intense metabolic activity, appearing to dedifferentiate and resemble meristematic cells. Symptoms typically occur in early summer. Concave depressions with asci in them on the top and bottom of leaves suggests direct penetration.

== Disease cycle ==
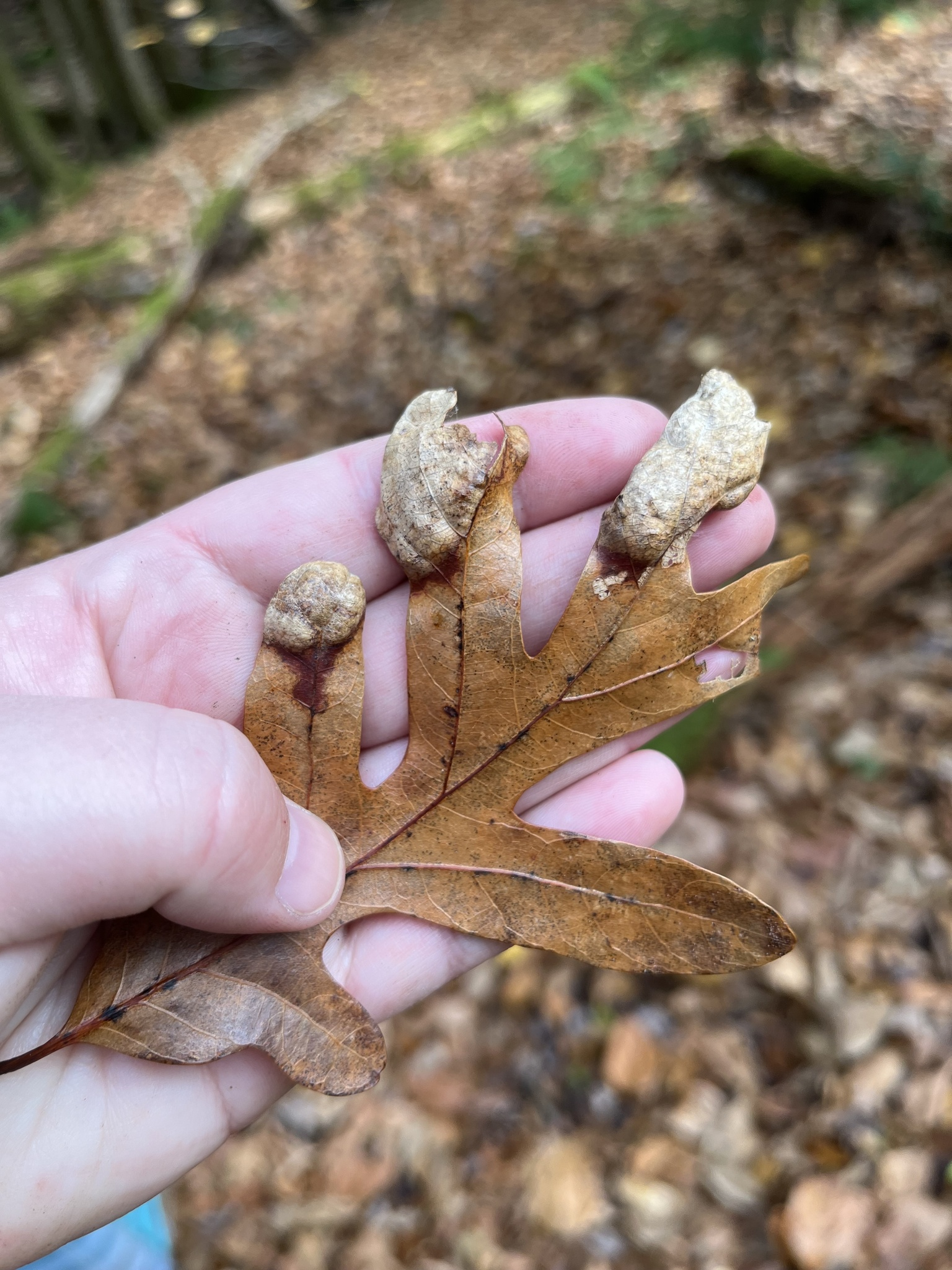
Oak leaf canker resulting from Taphrina caerulescens

Taphrina caerulescens is an ascomycete fungi. T. caerulescens, as is true for all species of Taphrina, has distinct parasitic and saprophytic stages. The two stages have varying morphologies. Saprophytic somatic cells overwinter in bark crevasses and bud scales. In early spring these spores infect young leaves as they first emerge. Infection triggers hyperplasia and hypertrophy, likely due to the production and excretion of a hormones called cytokines produced by Taphrina species, and other symptoms as described above. Taphrina species have been shown to produce cytokinin. A layer of asci emerge within the lesions on the bottom of the leaf. Ascus initials are found among mature asci. The asci initials are cytoplasmic containing lipid droplets and glycogen granules. Mature asci develop from the initials by nuclear fusion followed by mitosis. These asci sit naked on the leaf surface with no ascocarp. These mature asci are long single cells, unitruncate, and contain ascospores. With no special mechanism, ascospores are all forcibly discharged from the ascus to sit on the leaf surface.

Blastospores and conidia bud directly, with a noticeable constriction point, from these ascospores while in the ascus as well as after they have discharged. Germination of spores has been observed in the ascus as well. These spores may then infect tissue or remain in a saprophytic stage. In the lab, 20% of conidia form germ tubes by 48 hours after release from the ascus. Germ tubes protrude from the apical end of conidia. Extending hyphae are long and thin, sometimes branch, and in an appressed manner appear to follow the leaf contours in growth. These hyphae grow over guard cells and enter the leaf tissue through open stomata. Two germ tubes may even form from the same spore, the second protruding from the opposite end of the cell. This is the only known method of entry by T. caerulescens, no direct penetration or appresoria have been observed in this species. Thus, infection occurs only on the underside of leaves, where stomata are found. In the saprophytic stage the single celled spores grow like yeast, that is to say they bud (replicate) directly. Spores may be disseminated by wind or rain. These cells then overwinter and serve as inoculum the following spring.

== Environment ==
Taphrina caerulescens, as with all other Taprhina species, thrives in cool, wet environments. Environmental conditions play a large role in the ability of Taphrina species because they are highly dependent upon leaf surface moisture to infect budding leaf tissue. A similar species to T. caerulescens is the more studied T. deformans (causing leaf peach curl) which requires temperatures to be less than 16 and 19°C in the infection and incubation for the pathogen to infect successfully. Some scientists argue that the pathogen is especially successful at such low temperatures, not necessarily because it is so well adapted to low temperatures, but also in part because at higher temperatures the plant is able to outgrow the infection, as evidenced by hyphal growth being present in leaf tissue in both <16°C and >16°C.

== Control ==
Management recommendations for oak leaf blister is primarily to focus on mitigating other stressors to the tree. Watering and fertilizing infected trees can help reduce stress on the tree and can reduce disease symptoms . Sanitation methods such as removing fallen leaves in autumn can reduce disease inoculum for the following spring Fungicide application is not a necessary management strategy because T. caerulescens does not severely harm plant health and is considered a purely cosmetic disease. If, in rare cases, the disease is severe, fungicides can be applied in spring before the tree buds. Fungicides recommended are: Bordeaux mixture, chlorothalonil, liquid copper, and liquid lime sulfur. If homeowners decide fungicides are necessary, plant pathologists recommend hiring professionals to apply the chemicals and not apply the sprays themselves. Fungicides must be applied before the tree buds to be effective. Once the spores have infected the young bud tissue in spring it will be too late to reduce disease by fungicide treatment. Application of fungicides can reduce symptoms of the T. caerulescens, but once the disease is present it can only be reduced, not eradicated As with most foliar fungal diseases, it is too late to apply a fungicide if symptoms are already being spotted, and all management options will be to reduce inoculum for the next spring by raking leaves, or to apply a chemical spray the following spring to reduce infection.

== Importance ==
Oak leaf blister is not considered a significant threat to tree health and is a cosmetic disease. Although the disease causes very little damage to plant health, it is important because it is found throughout the United States.

== Similar species ==
The blisters and masses of pale spores produced by T. caerulescens can resemble the felty mass caused by the erineum mite, Aceria mackiei. Click on the proceeding reference link for photos comparing the two.
