= Taphrina bullata =

Scientific classification
- Domain: Eukaryota
- Kingdom: Fungi
- Division: Ascomycota
- Class: Taphrinomycetes
- Order: Taphrinales
- Family: Taphrinaceae
- Genus: Taphrina
- Species: T. bullata

Binomial name
- Taphrina bullata (Berk. & Broome) Tul. (1866)

Species of fungus

Taphrina bullata is an ascomycete fungus that is a plant pathogen. It causes leaf blisters on pear trees.
