= Sphaeroblast =

Woody extrusion from tree trunk or branch

A sphaeroblast is a woody extrusion from the trunk or branch of a tree, usually taking the form of a rounded spherical shape, as if the tree had a boil or mole.

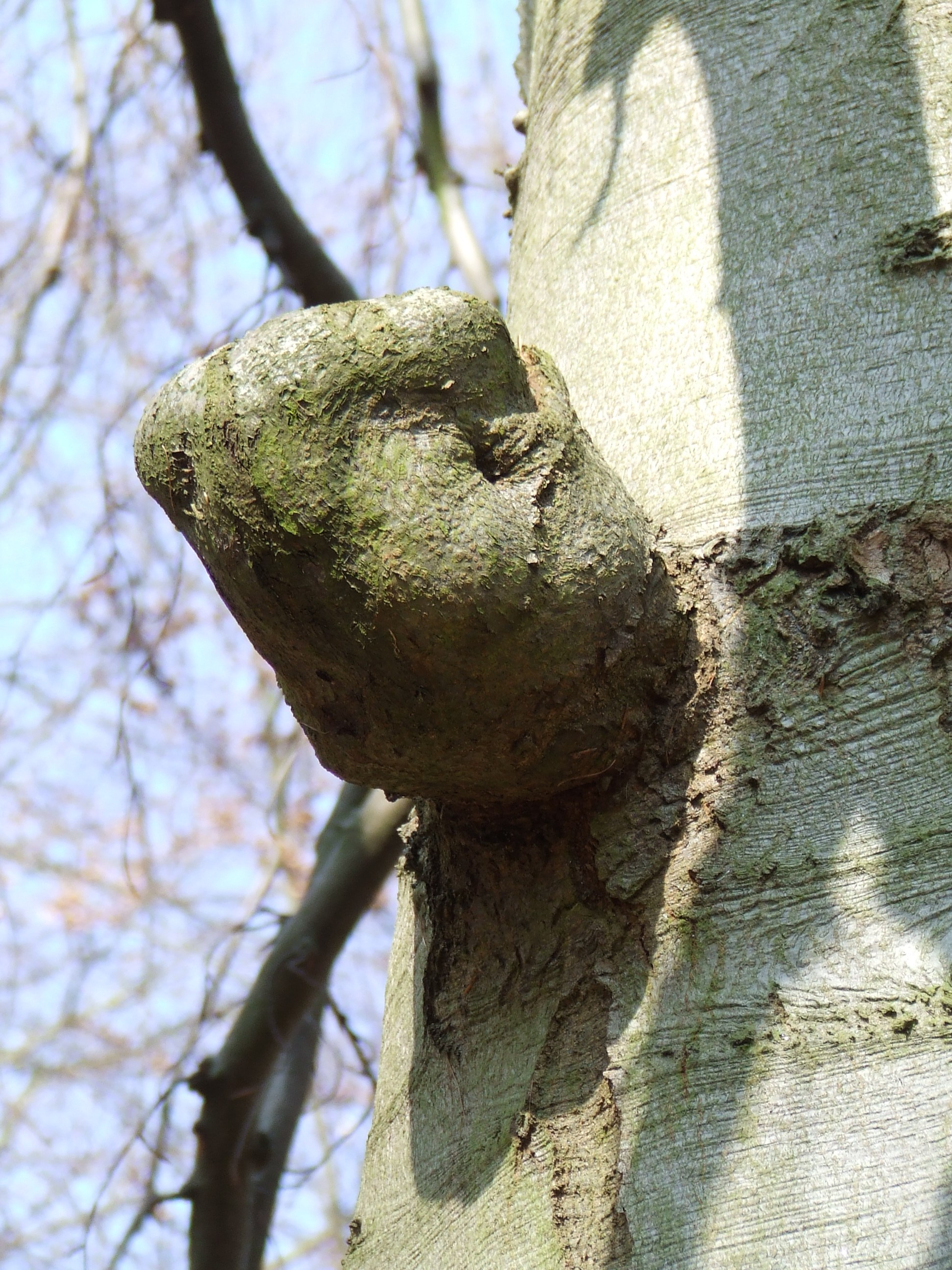
Photograph of a sphaeroblast on the trunk of a weeping beech tree (Fagus sylvatica 'Pendula')

Sphaeroblasts originate from a bud initial or a cluster of buds (especially adventitious buds) on the trunk or branch that have abnormally generated a rounded layer of cambium and then subsequently secondarily thickened to produce wood (xylem), rather than growing shoots or foliage. It is possible that sphaeroblasts are formed in the presence of microbes, as is the case with a witch's broom formed in a tree, but there has been little scientific research on what causes sphaeroblasts to form and it may be the case that there are a number of different causes of this anomalous growth form, pathogenic or physiological.

Sphaeroblasts are quite common on species of beech (Fagus), holly (Ilex), horse chestnut (Aesculus) and southern beeches (Lophozonia), and also occasionally appear on quite a wide range of other tree species, including conifers. They can be of interest to wood carvers, to create unique wooden ornaments. Their removal from the tree typically causes only a small wound to the trunk or branch, as they are often only superficially attached

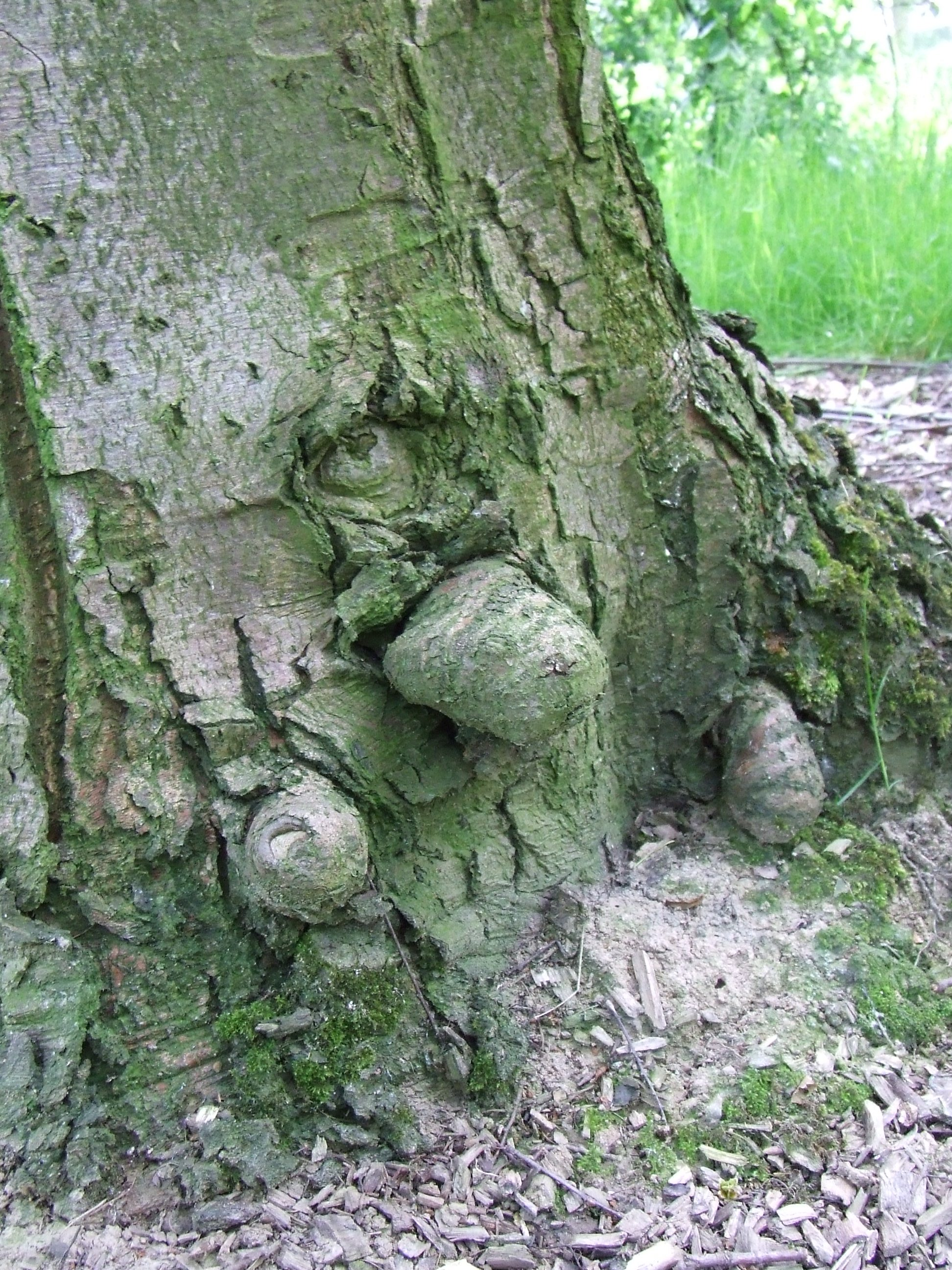
Sphaeroblasts formed at the base of a southern beech (Lophozonia alpina)

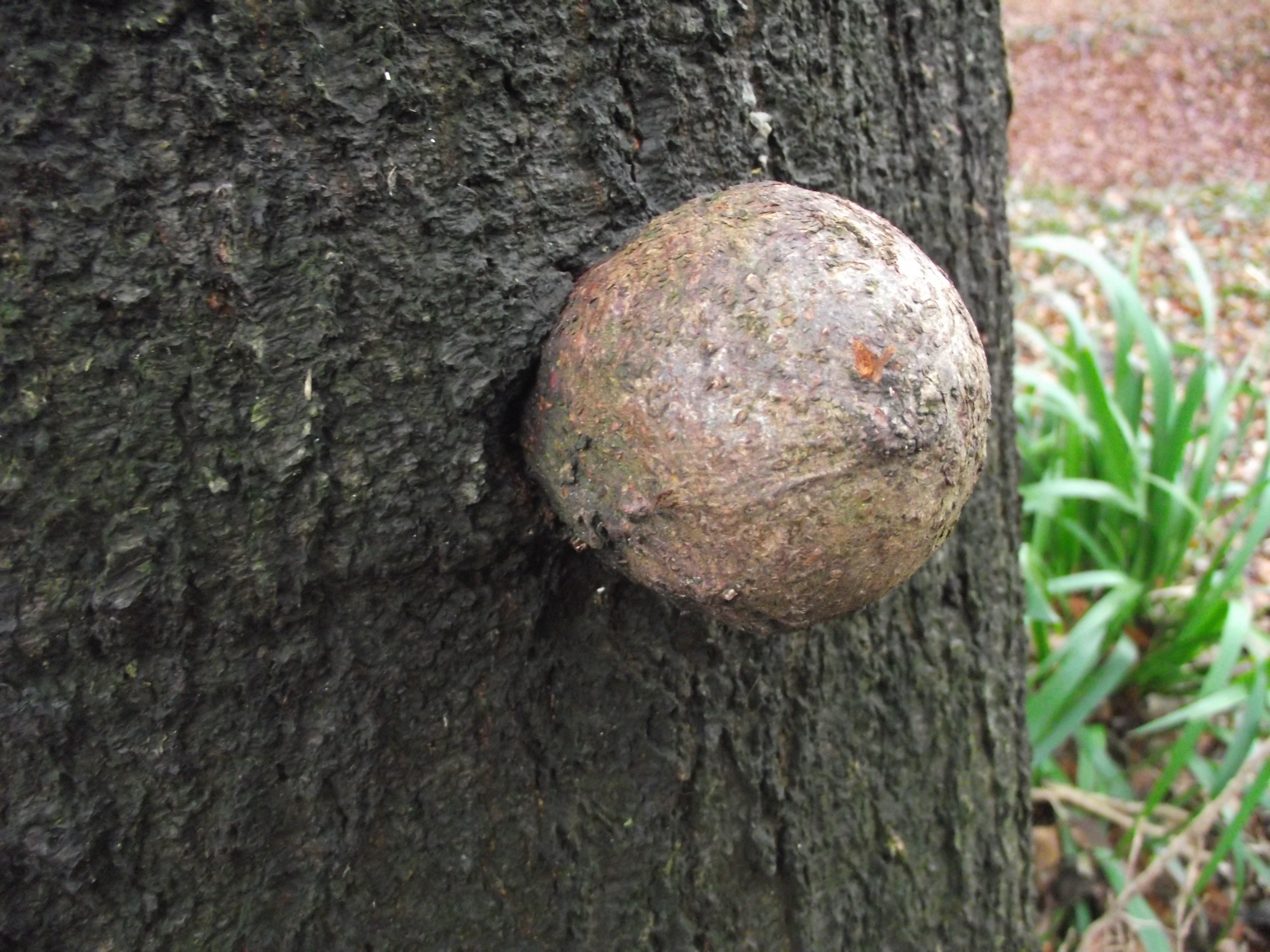
An image of a sphaeroblast formed on a mature beech tree (Fagus sylvatica)

There is no known case where the presence of sphaeroblasts has resulted in dieback or structural failure in a living tree. Sphaeroblasts represent only a very minor distortion of tree growth and are not considered to be a sign of ill-health in a tree.
