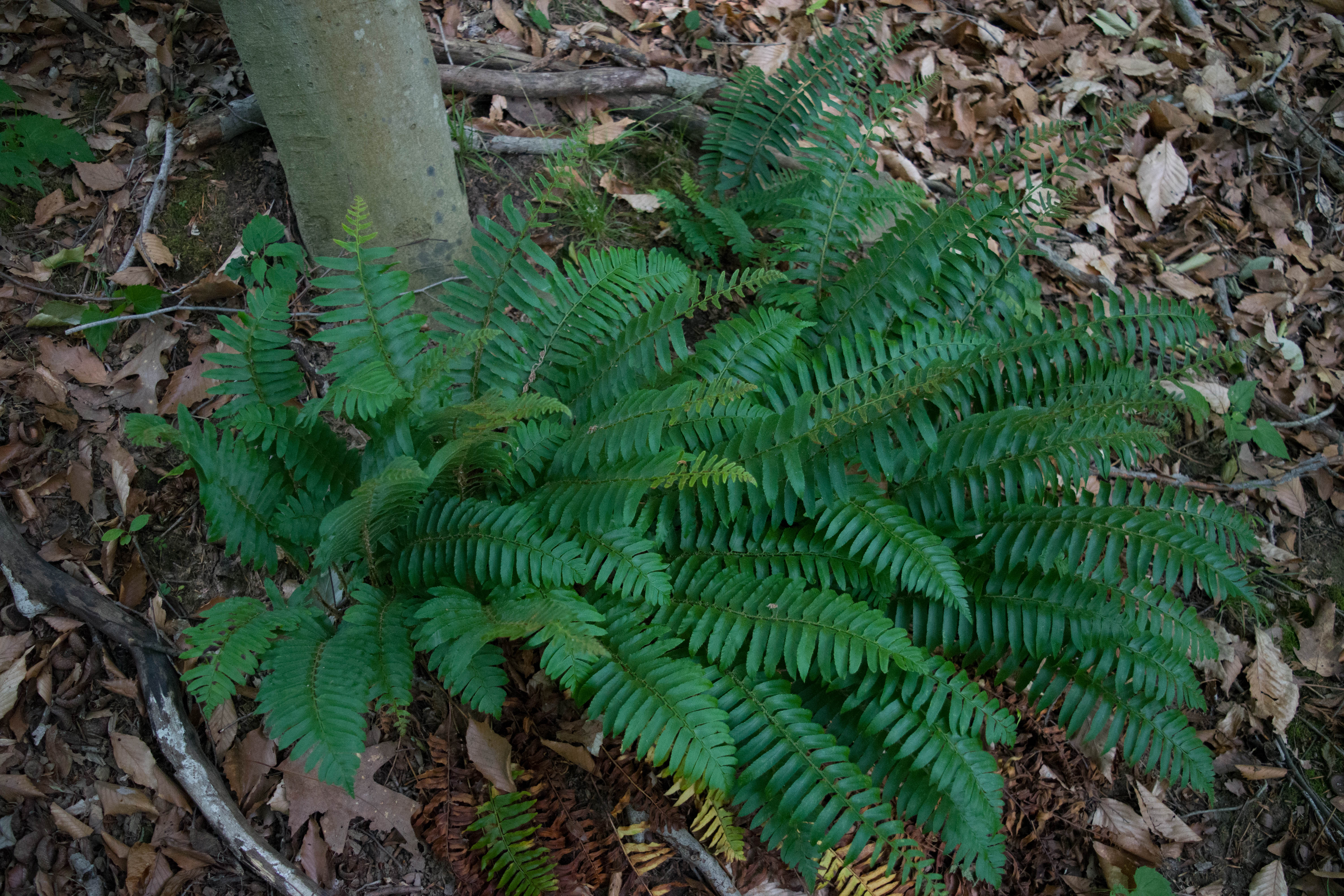

Conservation status
- Secure (NatureServe)

Scientific classification
- Kingdom: Plantae
- Clade: Tracheophytes
- Division: Polypodiophyta
- Class: Polypodiopsida
- Order: Polypodiales
- Suborder: Polypodiineae
- Family: Dryopteridaceae
- Genus: Polystichum
- Species: P. acrostichoides

Binomial name
- Polystichum acrostichoides (Michx.) Schott
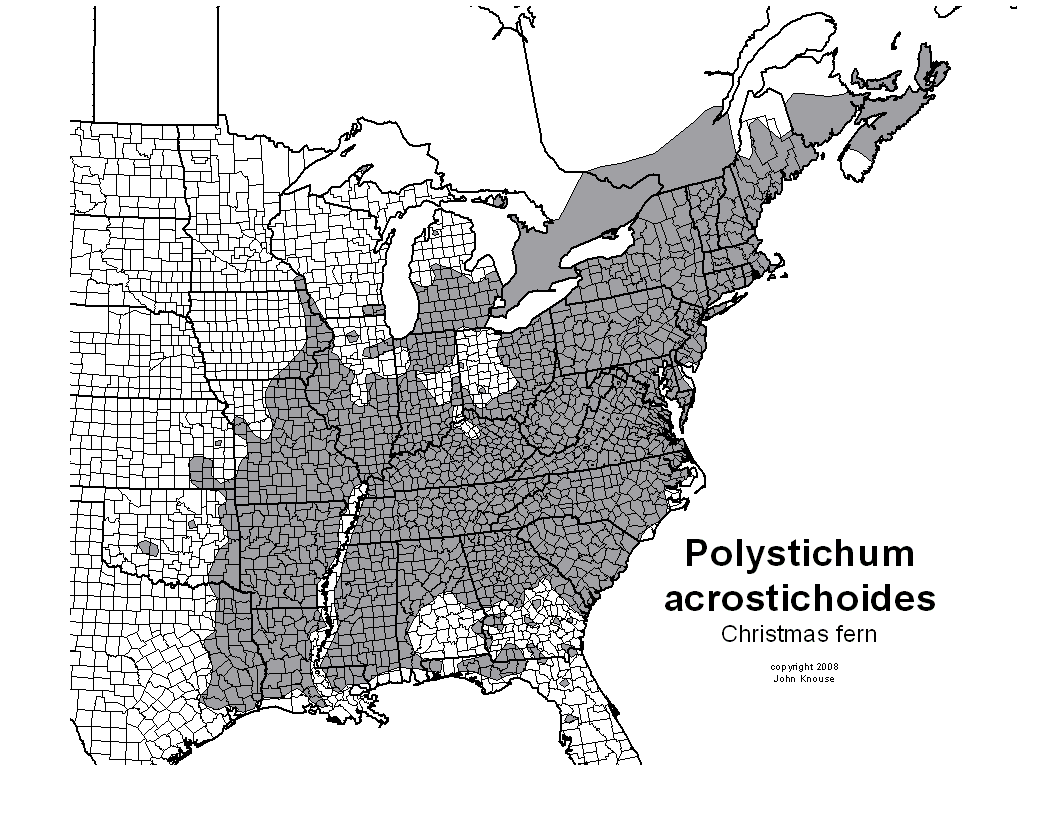
- Native range of Christmas fern in the United States

Synonyms
- Nephrodium acrostichoides Michx.

= Polystichum acrostichoides =

Species of fern

Polystichum acrostichoides, commonly denominated Christmas fern, is a perennial, evergreen fern native to eastern North America, from Nova Scotia west to Minnesota and south to Florida and eastern Texas. It is one of the most common ferns in eastern North America, being found in moist and shady habitats in woodlands, stream banks and rocky slopes. The common name derives from the evergreen fronds, which are often still green at Christmas.

== Description ==
Christmas fern has a tufted, clumping habit, with its fronds arising from a central growth point. It can form colonies, but frequently grows singly or in twos or threes. In winter, the fertile fronds die; the sterile fronds remain through the winter, and are Reoriented towards the ground from tropism cues caused by low temperatures and presence of snow. This is done in an attempt to save the frond due to the fern being an evergreen species. The frond is supported by a dark brown- to black-colored stipe, or stem, which is typically a quarter to a third of the overall frond length. Coarse, light-brown-to-tan scales cover the stipe, and are typically about 5-millimetre-long (0.20 in) and translucent. The coiled, developing fronds ("crosiers") are scaly, greyish and prominent in early spring.

Fronds are 30-to-80-centimetre-long (12 to 31 in) and 5-to-12-centimetre-broad (2.0 to 4.7 in), dark green and rather leathery in texture; their undersides may be covered in very sparse hairs. They have 20 to 35 pairs of pinnae. Each pinna is typically 4-centimetre-long (1.6 in) and has a finely serrulate or spiny edge, and is oblong to falcate in shape. The fine teeth or spines on the edge of the pinna are oriented towards its tip. Each pinna has a small, triangular, "thumblike" lobe at its base. The light brown spores are produced on fertile pinnae, at the frond's tip, which are conspicuously smaller than the sterile pinnae further down the frond. These fertile pinnae can be described as "acrostichoid", given that the sporangia occupy most of the lower surface of the pinna.

Christmas fern resembles the Pacific Coast sword fern, Polystichum munitum, although forming less expansive tufts and differing from it and from almost all other ferns in that fertile pinnae of the Christmas fern are noticeably reduced in size relative to the sterile pinnae, while being located on the same frond.

P. acrostichoides is known to hybridize with Polystichum braunii in areas where their ranges overlap.

== Ecology ==
P. acrostichoides is parasitized by the fungus Taphrina polystichi, which causes yellowish to whitish galls on the fronds.

The moth Herpetogramma sphingealis has larvae that feed on Christmas ferns. This moth species is primarily found where Christmas ferns are abundant and was given a scientific description in 2011.

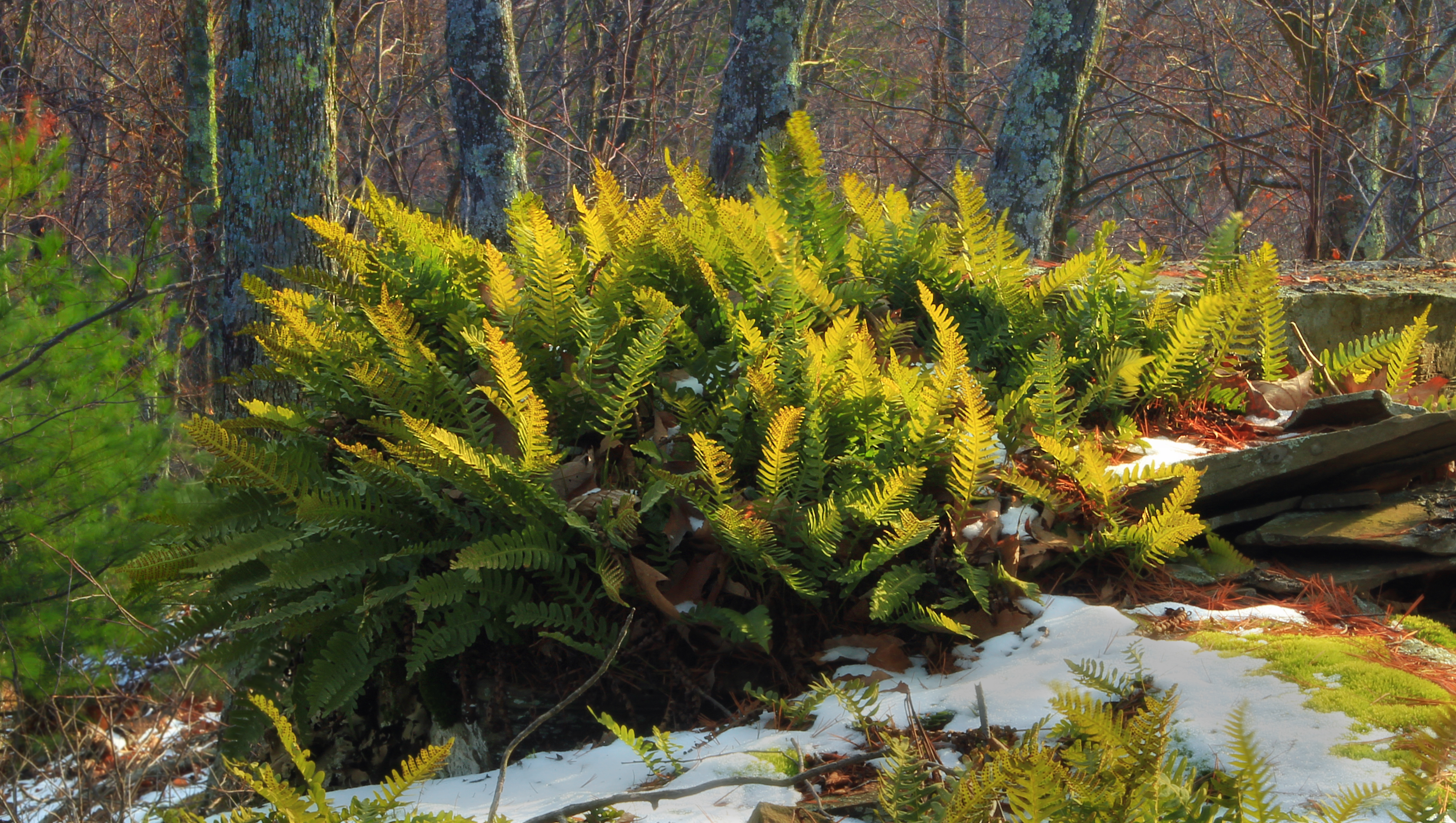
Polystichum acrostichoides growing in Tiadaghton State Forest, Lycoming County, along the Golden Eagle Trail.

== Cultivation ==
Christmas fern is popular in cultivation as an ornamental plant for gardens, including natural gardens, as it is easy to cultivate in a range of environments and soils. Being evergreen, it is sometimes used in winter-oriented garden design.

This fern can conserve soil and allay erosion of steep slopes. The fronds are semi-erect until the first killing frost, after which they lie prostrate on the ground and effectively hold in place the duff layer of the forest floor, enabling the gradual decomposition of the duff into humus, which in turn builds the soil.

== Gallery ==
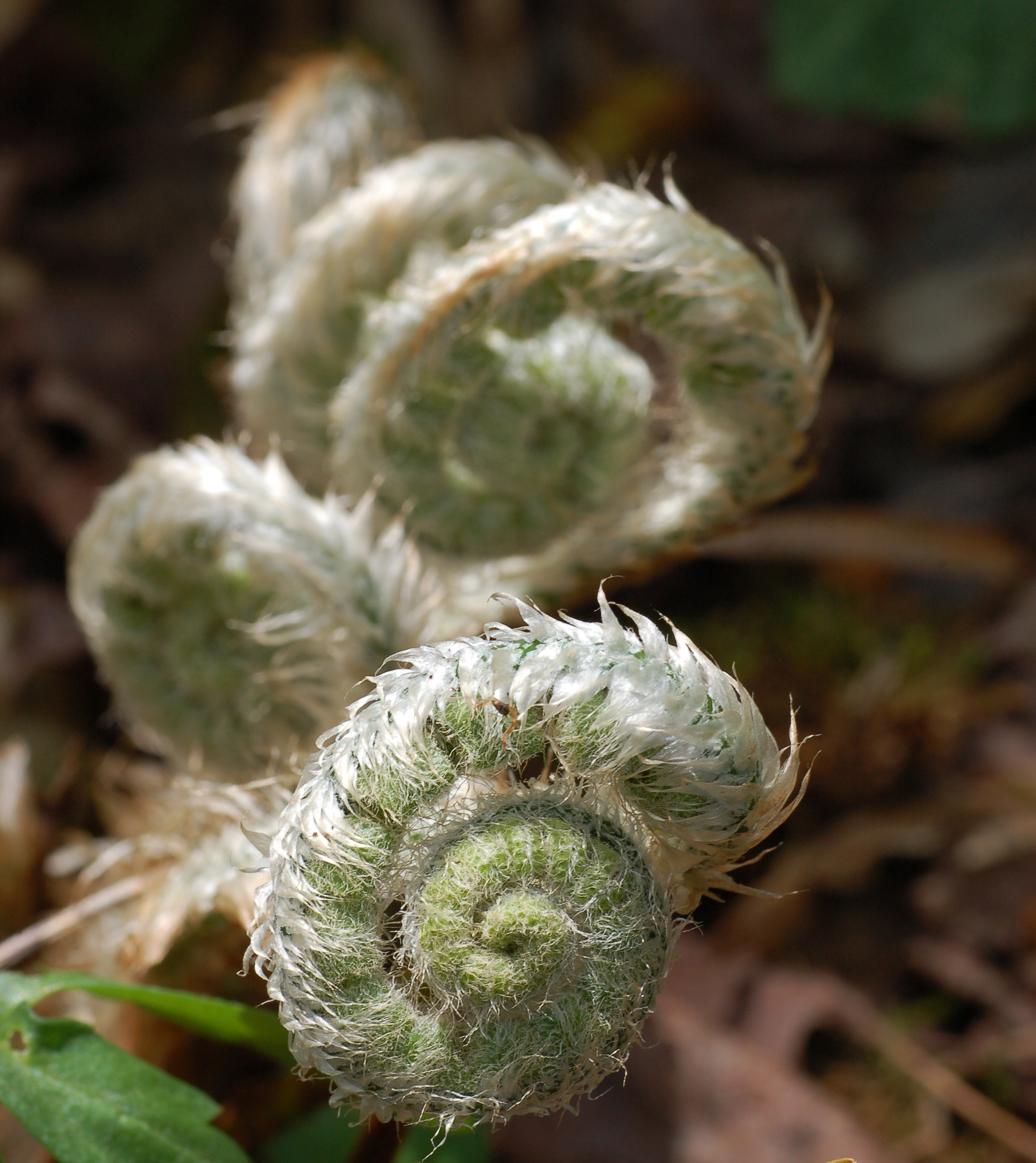
Coiled immature fronds

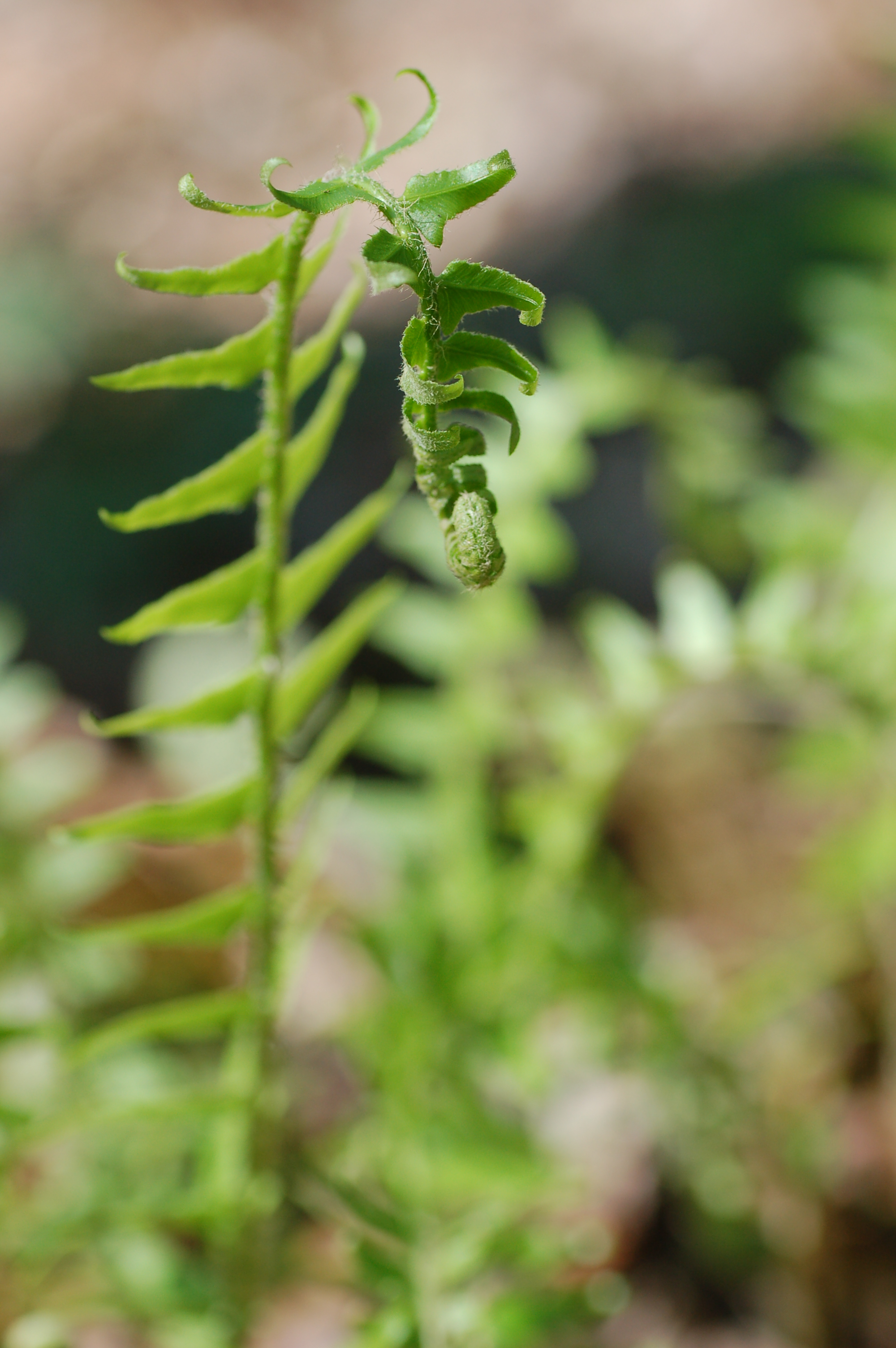
Newly unfurled frond

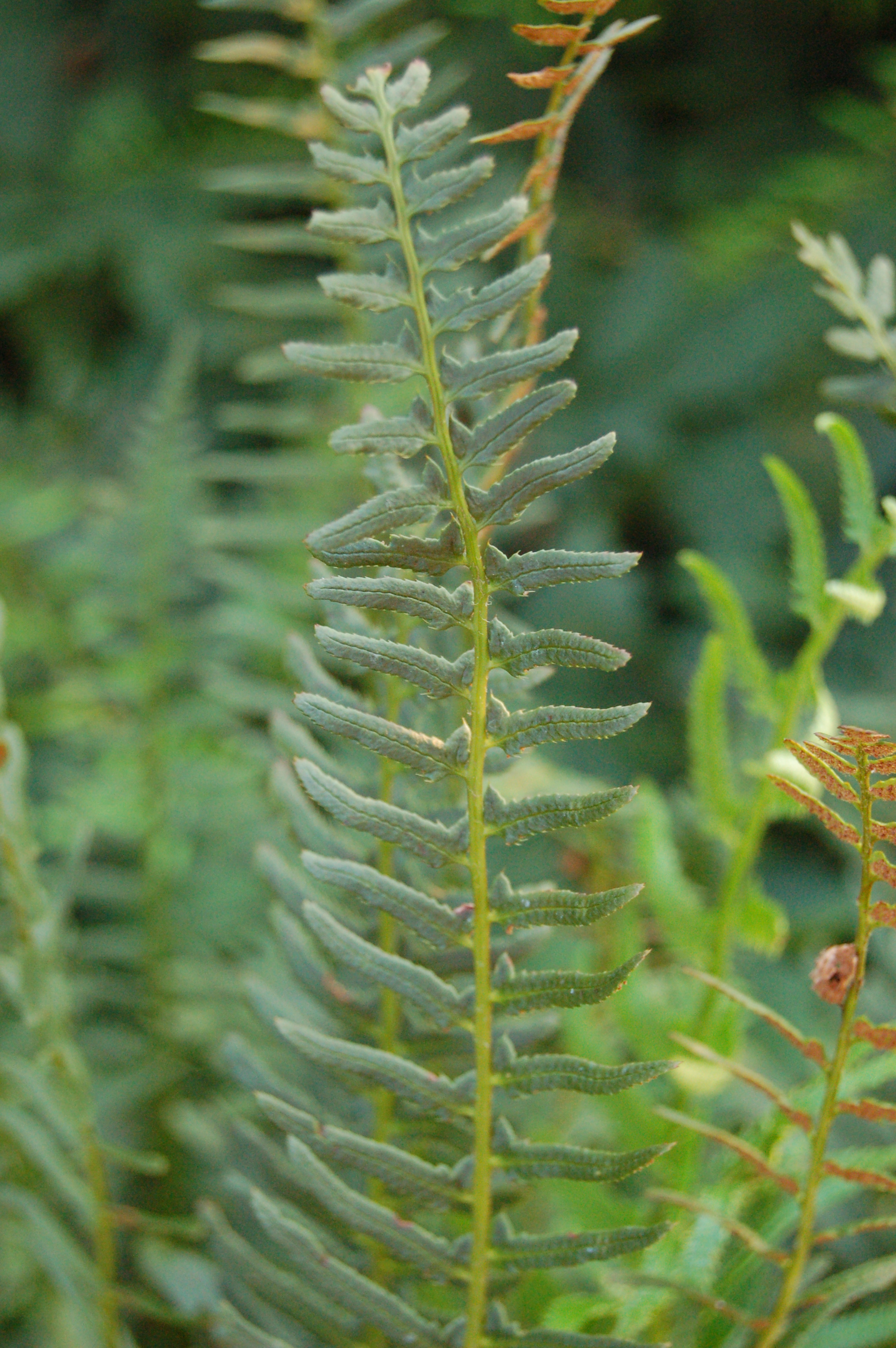
Mature sterile frond

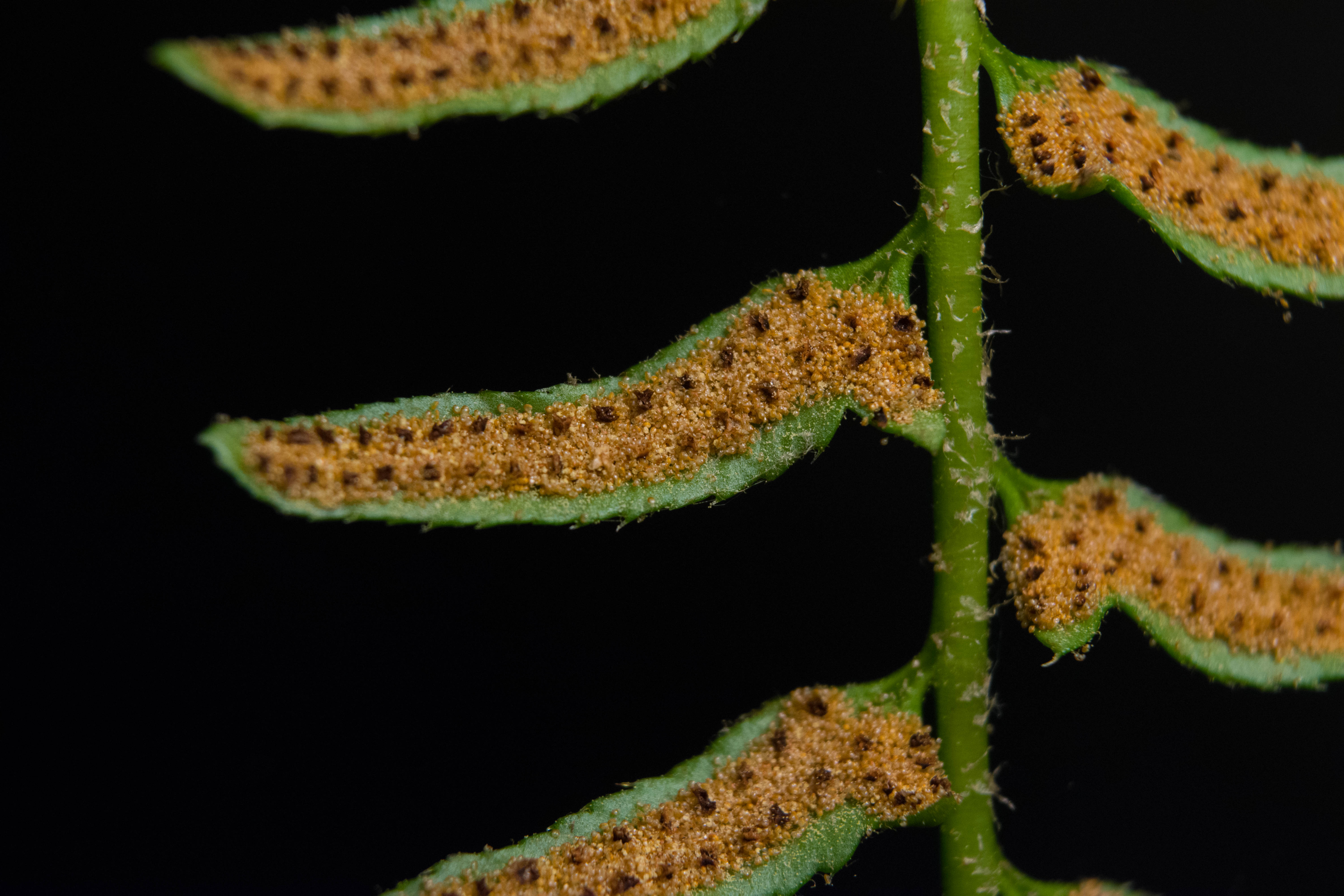
Sori
