= Leaf curl =

Plant disease

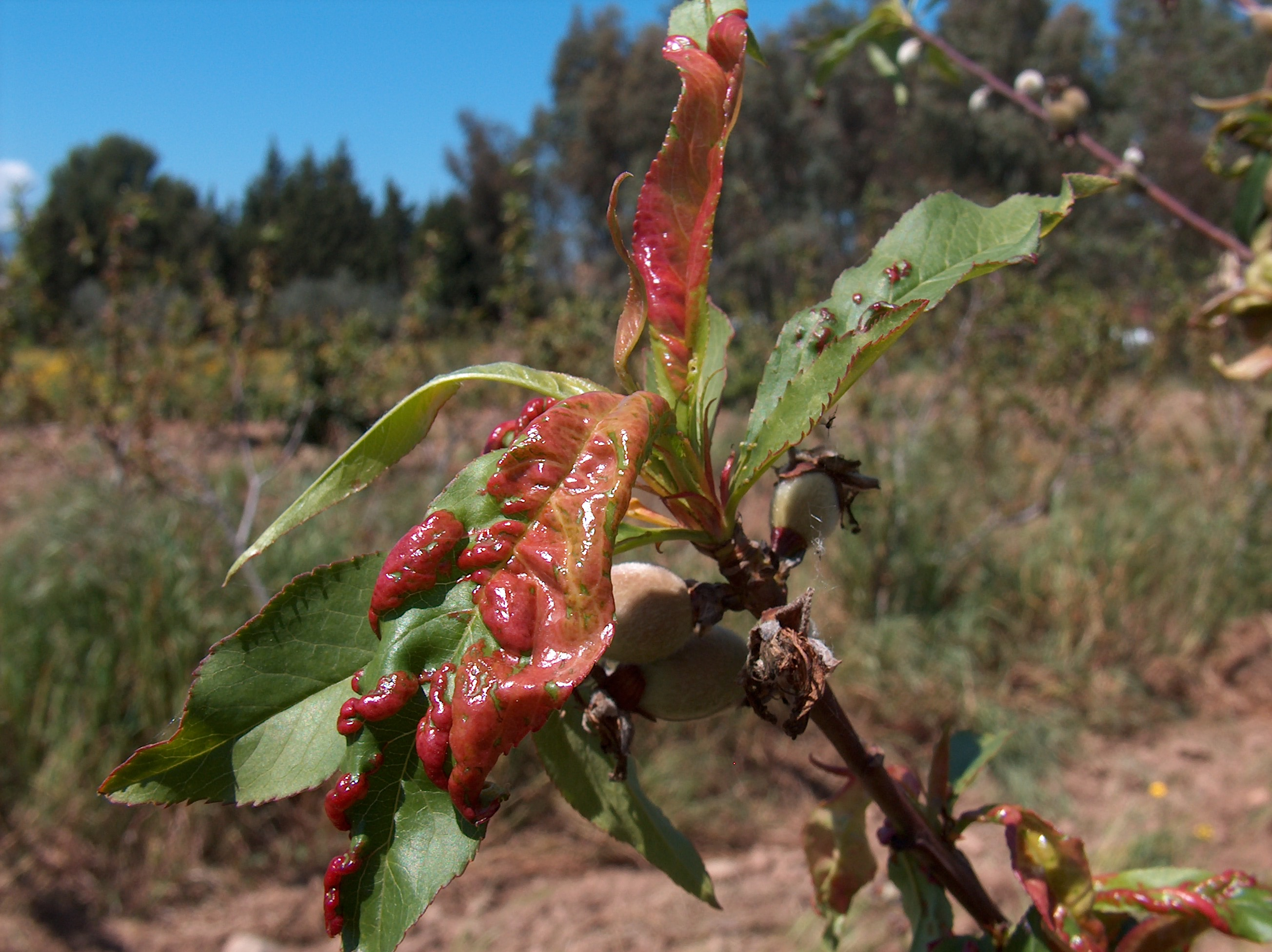
- Peach leaf curl
- Causal agents: Taphrina fungus
- Hosts: peach, almond
- Distribution: America, Europe, Asia, Africa, Australia, New Zealand

Peach leaf curl is a plant disease characterized by distortion and coloration of leaves and is caused by the fungus Taphrina deformans, which infects peach, nectarine, and almond trees. T. deformans is found in the United States, Europe, Asia, Africa, Australia, and New Zealand. Peach leaf curl reduces the amount of leaves and fruit produced by peach and nectarine trees.

== Affected species ==
Peach leaf curl mainly affects peach, nectarine, and almond trees. Apricots are generally immune to peach leaf curl (instead, the major apricot diseases are blossom wilt and branch dieback caused by Monilinia fructicola in the spring and Eutypa lata in the summer). However, in an isolated case in Hungary in 2011, peach leaf curl was also identified in apricot trees.

== Symptoms ==
Peach leaf curl is a distinctive and easily noticeable fungal disease, and the severity of the symptoms depends on how early infection has occurred. Diseased leaves can usually be identified soon after they emerge from the bud, due to their red color and twisted shape. As the leaves develop, they become increasingly distorted, and ultimately thick and rubbery compared to normal leaves. The color of the leaves changes from the normal green to red and purple, until a whitish bloom covers each leaf. Finally, the dead leaf may dry and turn black before it is cast off. Changes in the bark are less noticeable, if at all. Fruit may fail to develop from diseased blossoms. Any fruit that does develop from a diseased tree is usually normal, but sometimes may also be affected, showing a reddish color. Infected leaves fall early. The tree usually produces a second flush of leaves that is rarely diseased, except in an unseasonably cool and wet spring, because the fungus is not infectious at the normally higher temperatures in late spring and early summer.

== Cause of peach leaf curl ==
The fungus T. deformans causes deformed young leaves, red blisters, and ultimately the whitish bloom that covers the leaf as the infection progresses. This white color is made of asci that break through the cuticle of the leaf. One ascus consists of eight ascospores that create conidia, which are ejected in early summer and spread by rain and wind. The fungus survives the winter on the surface of the host plant, such as on bark or buds. In late winter or early spring, rainwater washes spores into the buds as they burst. Once this happens, no treatment is effective. In the spring, about two weeks after blossom, new leaves emerging from the infected buds are infected by the conidia. The disease may not occur every year due to variation in temperature and rainfall. Specifically, for successful infection, the fungus requires wet winters, where rain (not fog or dew) wets the tree for more than 12.5 hours at temperatures below 16 °C (61 °F). The fungus cannot grow at temperatures below 9 °C (48 °F).

== Control of the disease ==
Various methods are applied.

- The most effective method is to plant peach trees against a house wall under an overhanging roof, possibly covered by a mat during the winter, to keep winter rain from the buds before they burst (and incidentally to delay blossoming until spring frosts are over), until the temperature exceeds 16 °C (61 °F) in the spring, deactivating the fungus.
- Commercially, spraying the leaves with fungicides is the most common control method. The toxicity of these fungicides means they are not legally available to noncommercial growers in some countries. Spraying should be done in the winter well before budding. If trees are not sprayed early enough, treatment is ineffective. Copper-based mixtures (such as Bordeaux mixture) and lime sulphur are two fungicides commonly used.
- Peach cultivars can be planted which show some resistance to peach leaf curl, or at least regenerate rapidly, such as the white-fleshed Peach 'Benedicte'. For nectarines, the cultivar Kreibich is reported to have some resistance.

If a tree has peach leaf curl in a particular year, the disease will inexorably take its course, but measures can be taken to sustain the tree or maximize crop yield: protecting the tree from further rain at temperatures below 16 °C (61 °F), applying greasebands around the trunk to protect from insect infestation spreading the disease; providing nitrogen and excess water to minimize stress on the tree; and thinning the fruit. It is unclear whether removal of infected leaves from the tree is beneficial. Removing the infected leaves and fruit after they fall to the ground is sometimes also suggested but superfluous if, in the following winter, fungicides or rain protection are applied.

== History ==
Peach leaf curl was first introduced in America in 1852 and has now spread all over the country. By 1947, the disease was costing the United States $2.5 to 3.0 million annually.
