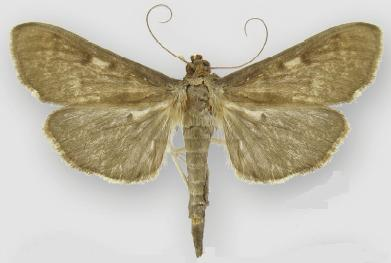

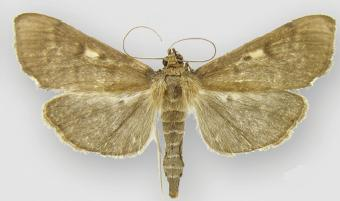
- Male (top) and female (bottom)

Scientific classification
- Kingdom: Animalia
- Phylum: Arthropoda
- Clade: Pancrustacea
- Class: Insecta
- Order: Lepidoptera
- Family: Crambidae
- Genus: Herpetogramma
- Species: H. sphingealis

Binomial name
- Herpetogramma sphingealis L. Handfield & D. Handfield, 2011

= Herpetogramma sphingealis =

Species of moth

Herpetogramma sphingealis is a small species of moth in the family Crambidae. It was described as a new species in 2011.

== Taxonomy ==
Herpetogramma sphingealis was described by Louis Handfield and Daniel Handfield in 2011.

The Latin name sphingealis refers to the sphingid-like appearance of the males.

== Description ==
The underside of the head, thorax and abdomen, including the legs, are pure white, so it is easily spotted when flying towards a light trap.

Imagoes, adult moths, are sexually dimorphic. The wingspan is 34–37 mm for males and 31–34 mm for females. Males are nearly uniform dark brown. The hind-wings are dark brown with a dark discal spot. Females have more apically-squared wings and are less uniformly dark coloured.

== Distribution ==
It is found from southern Quebec southward in eastern United States to Georgia and Louisiana and as far west as Arkansas.

== Ecology ==
=== Behaviour ===
The moth is readily attracted to light traps and flies around at the beginning of the night. It is sometimes one of the first species to come to a light trap. Its flight is darting and rapid.

The caterpillars have been recorded feeding primarily on Polystichum acrostichoides, commonly known as Christmas ferns, and occasionally on wood ferns. They are leaftiers that create protective shelters by rolling the fronds of their host plant into distinctive "fern balls".

=== Habitat ===
It occurs in the darkest areas of rich xeric forests, with maples and oaks, especially rocky, hilly, maple groves where Christmas ferns commonly occur. With its dark-brown colour the moth is cryptically coloured in its natural habitat and well adapted to hide in the darkest shadows of the woods.
