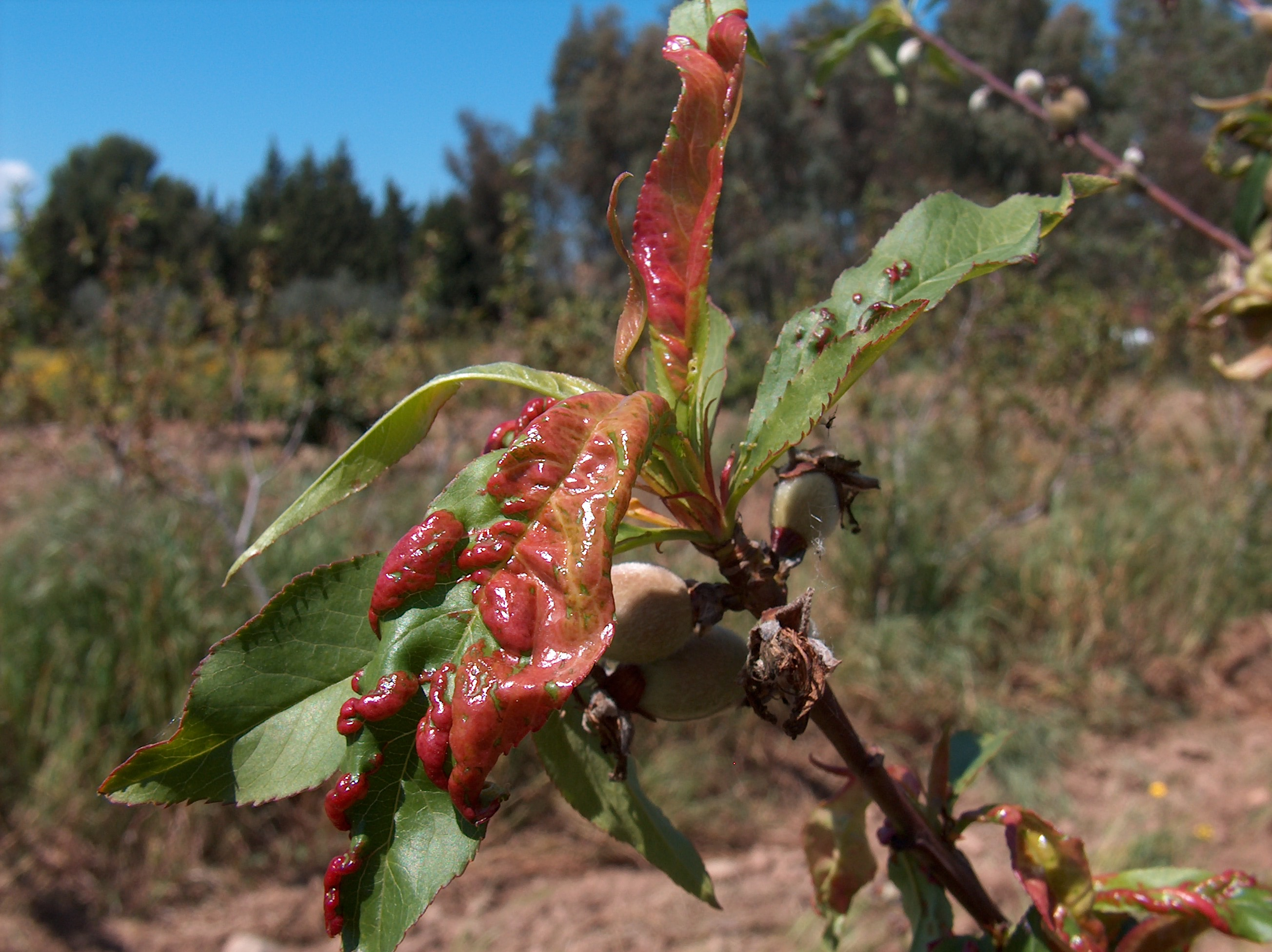

Scientific classification
- Kingdom: Fungi
- Division: Ascomycota
- Class: Taphrinomycetes
- Order: Taphrinales
- Family: Taphrinaceae
- Genus: Taphrina
- Species: T. deformans

Binomial name
- Taphrina deformans (Berk.) Tul. (1866)

Synonyms
- Ascomyces deformans Berk. (1860); Exoascus deformans (Berk.) Fuckel (1870); Exoascus amygdali Jacz. (1926); Taphrina amygdali (Jacz.) Mix (1936)

= Taphrina deformans =

Species of fungus

Taphrina deformans is a fungus and plant pathogen, and a causal agent[s] of peach leaf curl. Peach trees infected with T. deformans will experience leaf puckering and distortion, acquiring a characteristic downward and inward curl. Leaves will also undergo chlorosis, turning a pale green or yellow, and later show a red or purple tint. Fruit can either drop prematurely or show surface distortions. Severe infection can also produce lesions on the flowers. The host tree will experience defoliation if the leaves are badly diseased. If a seedling is severely infected, it may die. Almond trees display similar symptoms.

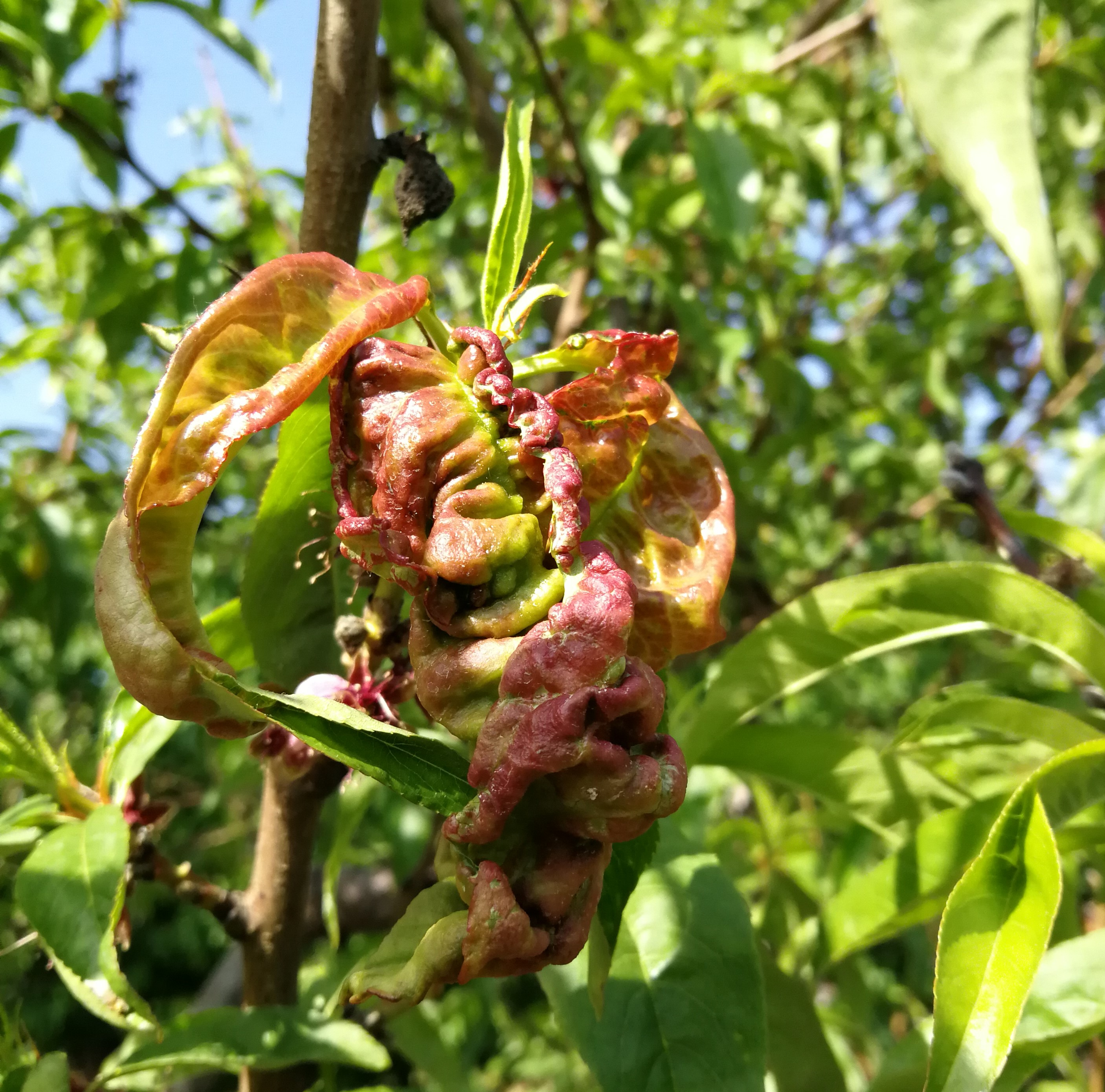
Taphrina deformans

== Life cycle ==
Taphrina deformans infects species of the genus Prunus (including P. amygdalus (almond) and P. persica (peach)). It is best known as the causative agent of peach leaf curl in peaches and nectarines. It has been observed that this fungus also infects the fruits of some South American trees like Ocotea puberula, Nectandra megapotamica and other Lauraceae species. An additional form has been identified which infects apricots. Some researchers posit that these forms are separate varieties altogether, which is supported by recent genetic evidence based on hybridization. Furthermore, almond strains of T. deformans seem to be unable to induce peach leaf curl on peach trees, and vice versa.

Infected leaves develop a whitish bloom as the infection progresses. This bloom consists of asci that break through the cuticle of the leaf by way of lysis. One ascus contains eight ascospores, which are ejected in early summer and moved by rain and wind. This fungus is believed to survive the winter by staying on the surface of the new host plant, such as on bark or buds. In the spring, new buds are infected by the conidia as the leaves emerge from the buds. The disease does not occur every year, as it requires a minimum of 3mm of rainfall followed by at least 12 days during which the developing conidia remain damp and at temperatures below 19 °C. The fungus has higher infection rates following cooler, damper winters.

Taphrina deformans hyphae growing in intercellular spaces secrete polysaccharide-degrading enzymes, such as cellulase, causing partial dissolution of the host cell wall. This process also results in changes in the plasma membrane. T. deformans also produces the auxin indole-3-acetic acid from L-tryptophan via indole-3-pyruvic acid and indole-3-acetaldehyde. This process is thought to be responsible for the hyperplastic effect of the infection.

== Peach leaf curl management ==
Because infection depends on a wet environment, appropriate irrigation of crops can help control pathogen dispersal. Although some sources also suggest thinning fruit to control the spread of disease, sanitation and culturing practices alone are insufficient to manage the pathogen. Fungicide is preferred; chlorothalonil and ziram are favored, and copper is an organic option. Fungicide application requires the correct timing and complete coverage of the crop. It is recommended that growers spray fungicides after leaf-fall, or after 90% senescence of leaves. In wetter climates, where multiple sprays may be necessary, spraying is recommended in the late fall and in late winter or early spring. Post-infection spraying of fungicide is inadequate to control the disease.

Although most commercial cultivars are susceptible, there are several genotypes of Prunus persica that have been identified as resistant to infection by T. deformans. These resistant genotypes appear to use molecular and biochemical mechanisms to manage the spread and development of the disease. For example, chlorogenic acid, which is known to have antifungal activity in vitro, is present in resistant strains but not susceptible strains. The chloroplasts are also activated as a site of defense signaling. Additionally, upregulation of the pattern of accumulation of isochorismate synthase indicates increased salicylic acid production. The activation of salicylic acid-dependent pathways suggests a mechanism to achieve systemic acquired resistance.

== Importance ==
Peach leaf curl is present wherever peaches or nectarines are grown. The economic impact of the disease varies regionally, as pathogen spread and symptom severity depends on environmental factors. In the United States, $2.5 to 3 million dollars are lost because of peach leaf curl. Sixty to ninety percent of peach shoots in Italy can be infected by T. deformans. Although peach leaf curl is mostly manageable with fungicide spraying in dry climates, improper timing or incomplete coverage of the crop can result in control failure. Wetter climates which require multiple applications of fungicide will be more susceptible to human error. Additionally, unexpected winter warming can allow the pathogen to establish itself within buds before the late winter or early spring application of fungicide. Without fungicides, or through control failure, the disease can result in total yield loss, along with the stunting and death of shoots. Yield loss can result from tree defoliation, leading to decreased photosynthesis, and from infection of fruit, which decreases marketability.

== Taphrina deformans genome ==
Taphrina deformans genome has been sequenced. The genome carries characteristic genes that are important for the plant infection process.
