= Witch's broom =

Type of deformity in a woody plant

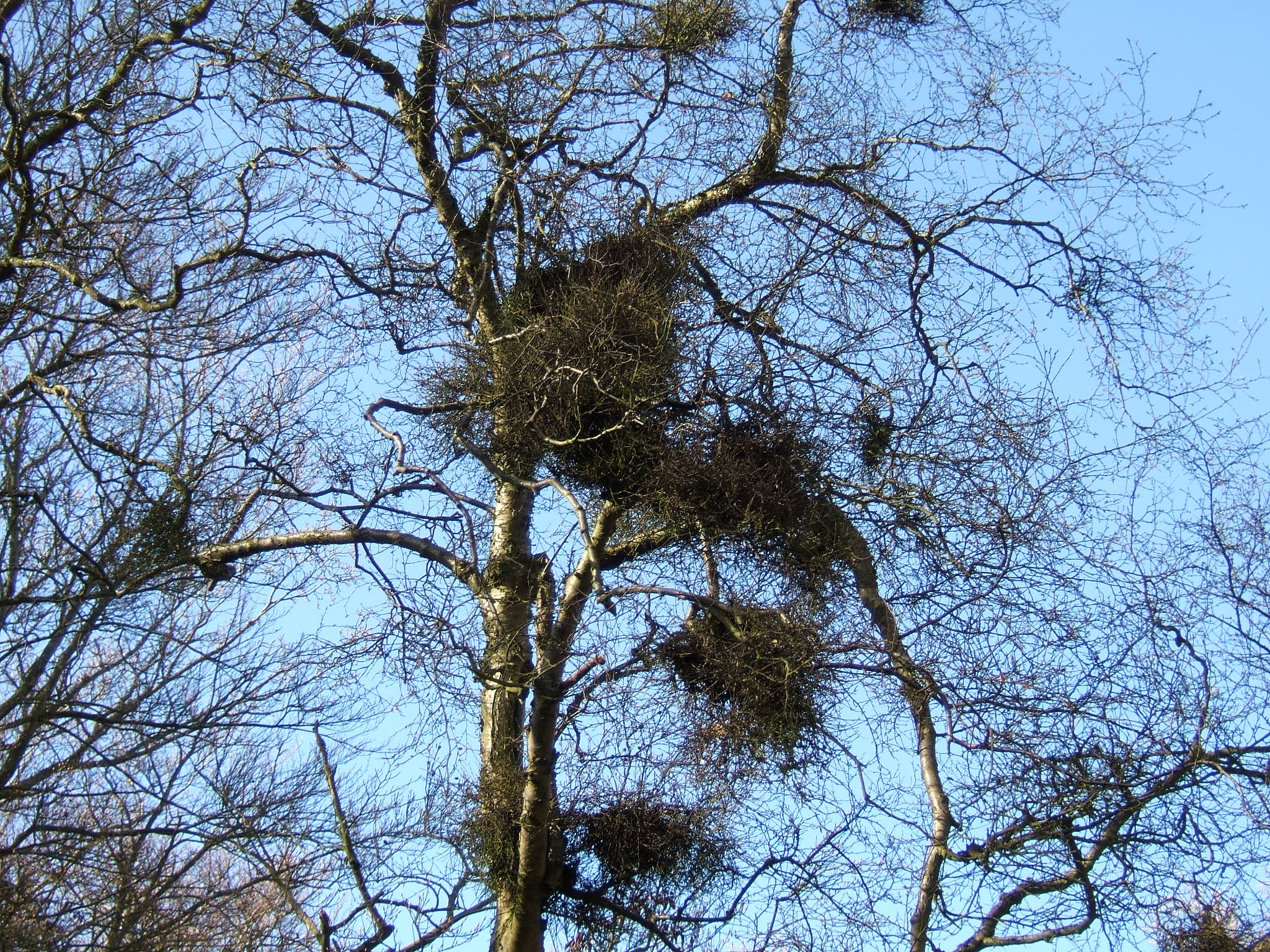
Witch's brooms on downy birch, caused by the fungus Taphrina betulina

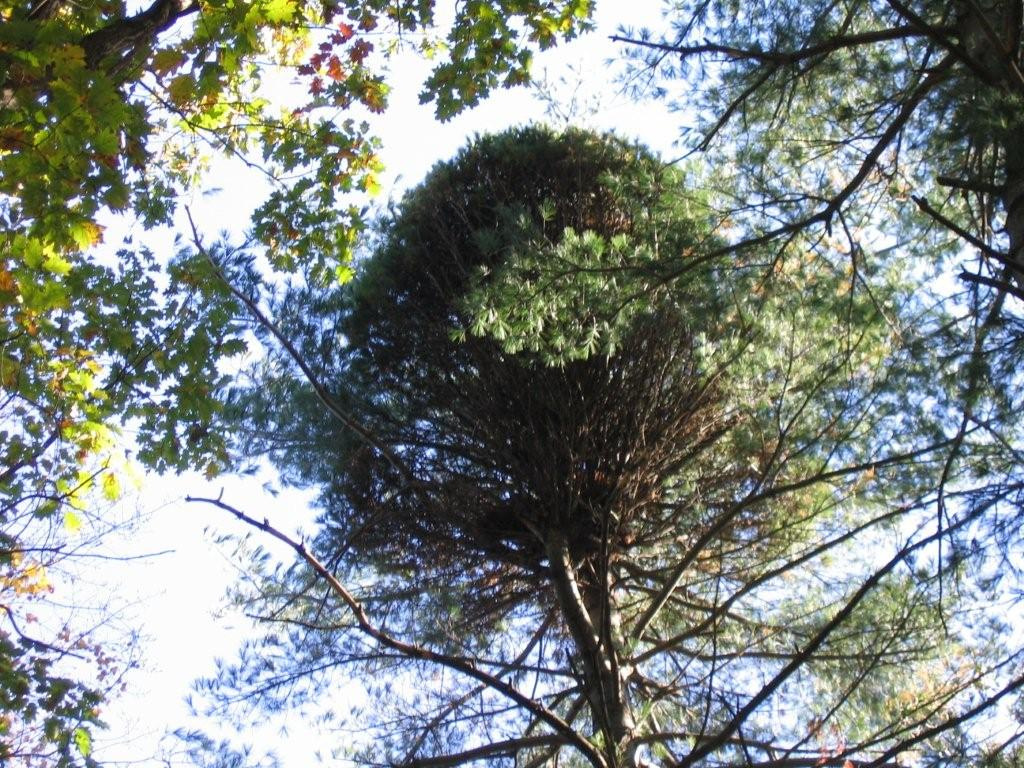
Witch's broom on a white pine

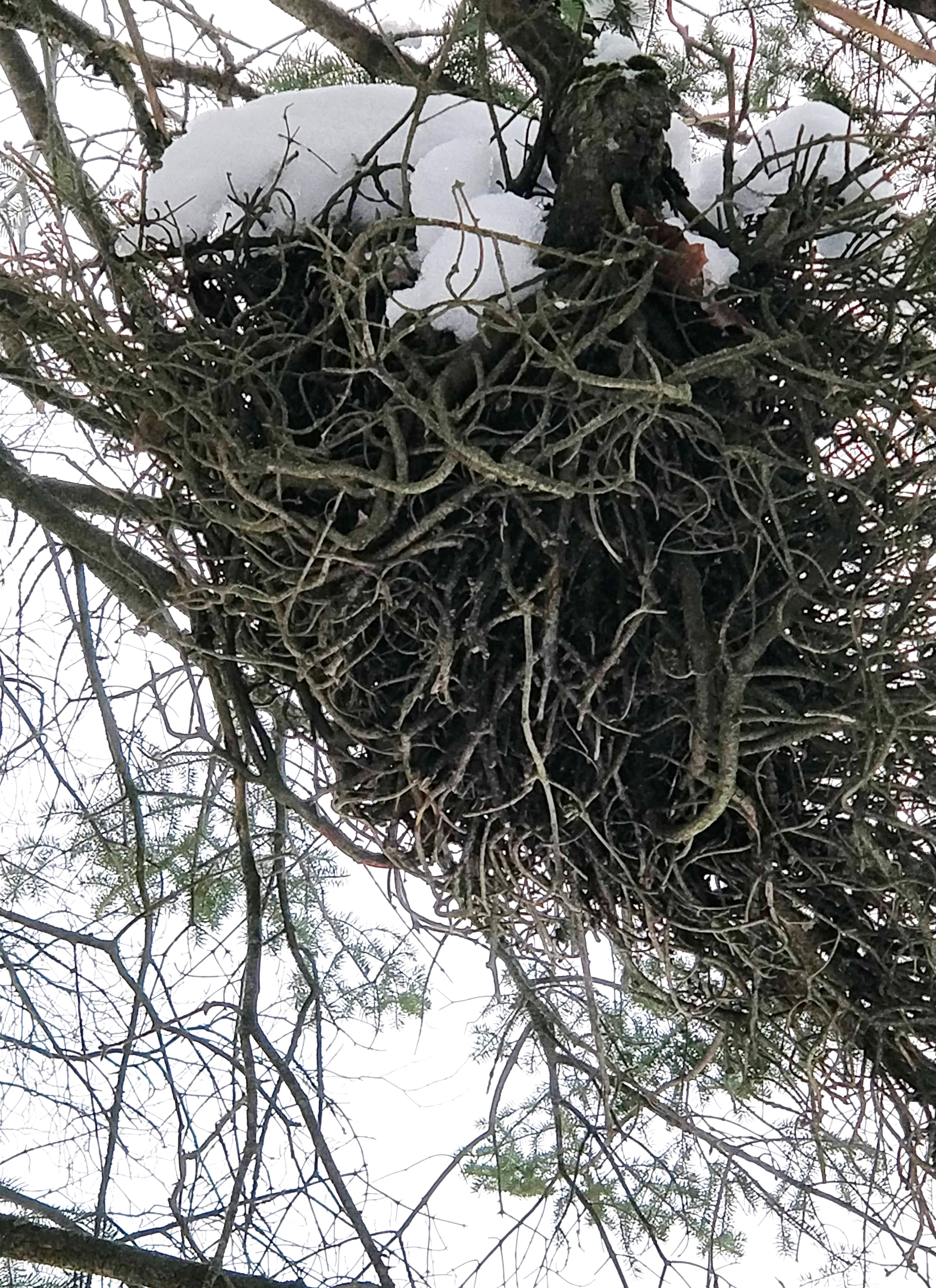
Witch's broom in Yamaska National Park, Québec

Witch's broom or witches' broom is a deformity in a woody plant, typically a tree, where the natural structure of the plant is changed. A dense mass of shoots grows from a single point, with the resulting structure resembling a broom or a bird's nest. It is sometimes caused by pathogens.

Diseases with symptoms of witches' broom, caused by phytoplasmas or basidiomycetes, are economically important in a number of crop plants, including the cocoa tree Theobroma cacao, jujube (Ziziphus jujuba) and the timber tree Melia azedarach.

== Causes ==
A tree's characteristic shape, or habit, is in part the product of auxins, hormones that control the growth of secondary apices. The growth of an offshoot is limited by the auxin, while that of the parent branch is not. In cases of witch's broom, the normal hierarchy of buds is interrupted, and apices grow indiscriminately. This can be caused by cytokinin, a phytohormone that interferes with growth regulation. The phenomenon can also be caused by other organisms, including fungi, oomycetes, insects, mites, nematodes, phytoplasmas, and viruses. The broom growths may last for many years, typically for the life of the host plant. If twigs of witch's brooms are grafted onto normal rootstocks, freak trees result, showing that the attacking organism has changed the inherited growth pattern of the twigs. Hemiparasitism by the dwarf mistletoes species in genus Arceuthobium are noted to induce witch's broom formation in parasitized branches of pines and cypresses.

== Ecological role ==
Witches' brooms provide nesting habitat for birds and mammals, such as the northern flying squirrel, which nests in them.

== See also ==
- Mistletoe, a group of hemiparasitic plants that require attachment to a host plant to grow
- Plant development#Buds and shoots, atypical shoot development
- Epicormic shoot, a shoot that develops from buds under the bark
- Forest pathology
- Longan witches broom-associated virus
- Melampsora, can cause different kinds of witch's brooms
- Moniliophthora perniciosa, cause of witch's broom disease in cacao
- Phyllody, a related plant growth abnormality affecting flowers
