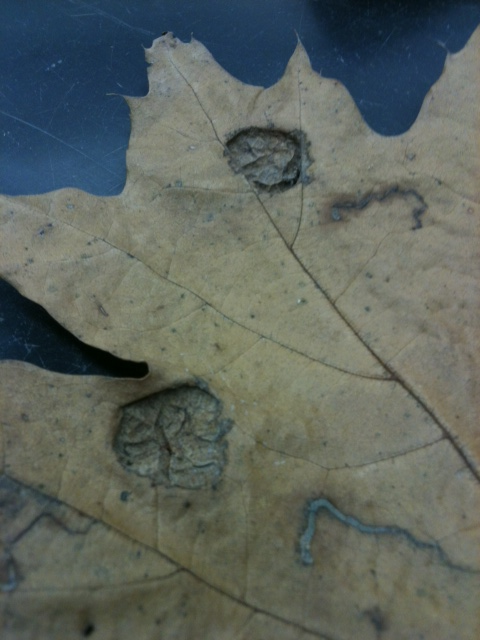
- Taphrina caerulescens on oak leaf

Scientific classification
- Kingdom: Fungi
- Division: Ascomycota
- Class: Taphrinomycetes
- Order: Taphrinales
- Family: Taphrinaceae; Gäum. (1928)

Type genus
- Taphrina Fr. (1815)

Genera
- Lalaria; Taphrina

= Taphrinaceae =

Family of fungi

The Taphrinaceae are a family of fungi in the order Taphrinales. According to a 2008 estimate, the family contains 2 genera and 118 species.
