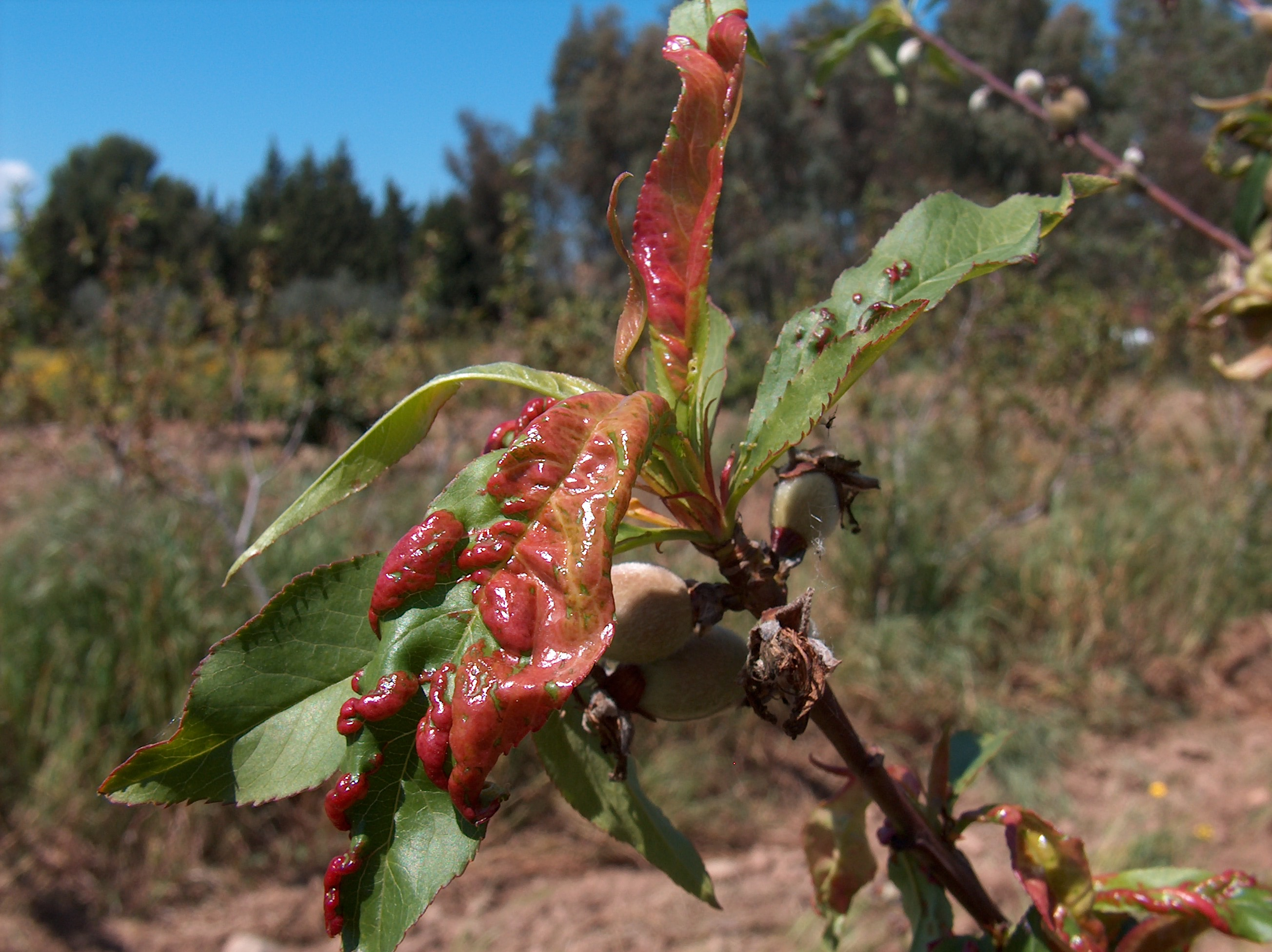
- Peach leaf curl caused by Taphrina deformans

Scientific classification
- Kingdom: Fungi
- Division: Ascomycota
- Subdivision: Taphrinomycotina
- Class: Taphrinomycetes; O.E.Erikss. & Winka (1997)
- Subclass: Taphrinomycetidae; Tehler
- Order: Taphrinales; Gäum. & C.W.Dodge (1928)

Families
- Protomycetaceae; Taphrinaceae

= Taphrinomycetes =

Class of fungi

The Taphrinomycetes are a class of ascomycete fungi belonging to the subdivision Taphrinomycotina. It includes the single order Taphrinales, which includes 2 families, 8 genera and 140 species.
