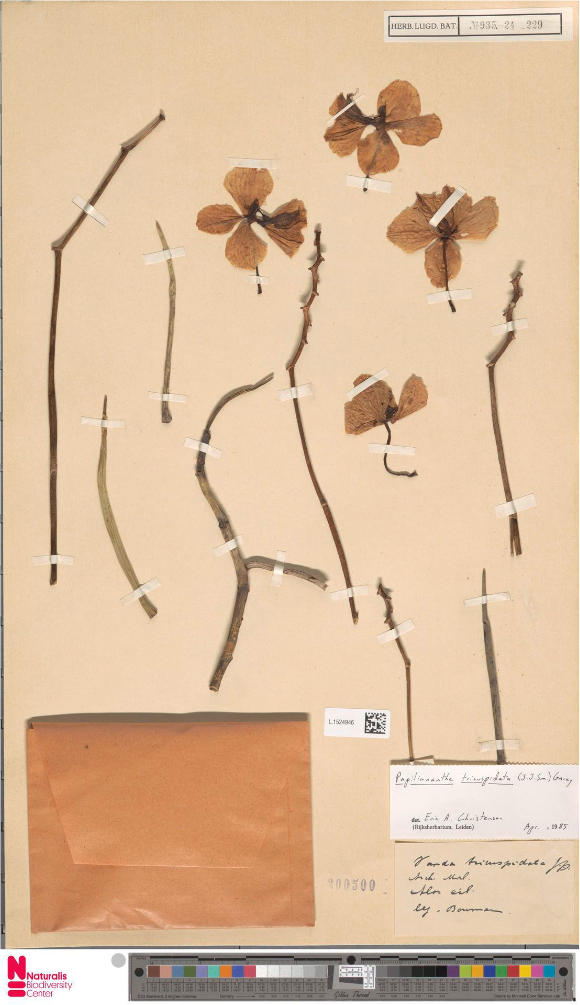
- herbarium specimen

Scientific classification
- Kingdom: Plantae
- Clade: Tracheophytes
- Clade: Angiosperms
- Clade: Monocots
- Order: Asparagales
- Family: Orchidaceae
- Subfamily: Epidendroideae
- Genus: Papilionanthe
- Species: P. tricuspidata

Binomial name
- Papilionanthe tricuspidata (J.J.Sm.) Garay
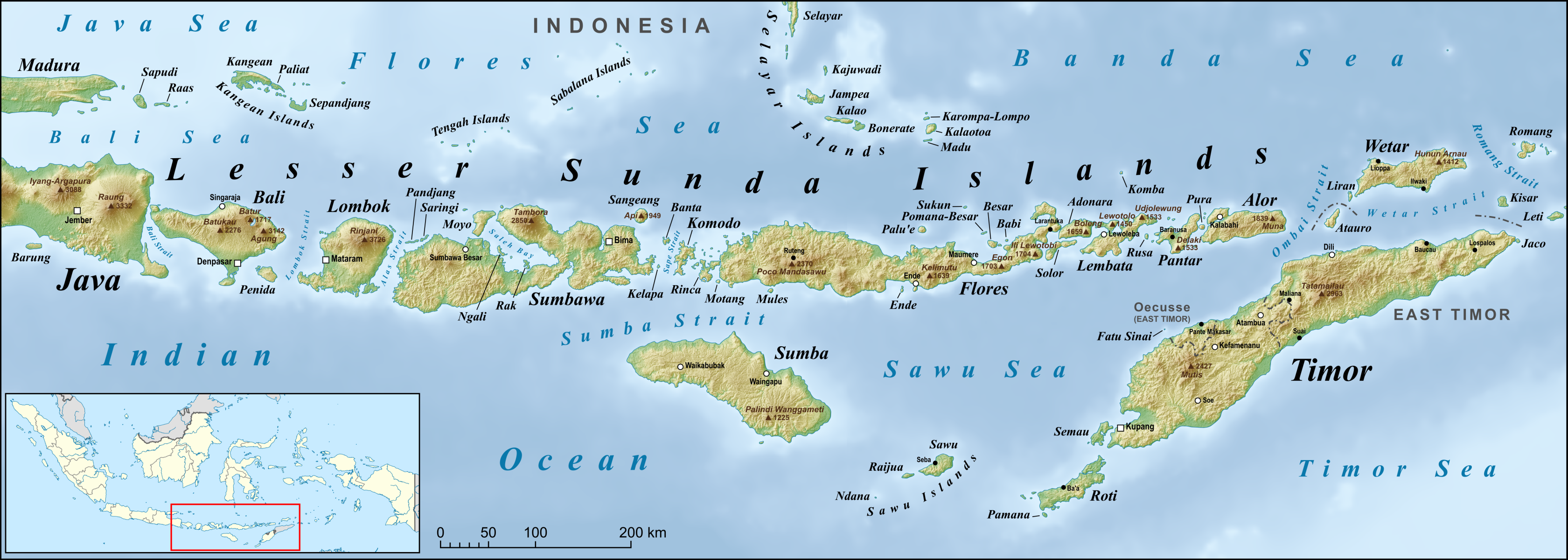
- Distribution of Papilionanthe tricuspidata

Synonyms
- Vanda tricuspidata J.J.Sm.

= Papilionanthe tricuspidata =

Species of epiphytic orchid

Papilionanthe tricuspidata is a species of epiphytic orchid endemic to the Lesser Sunda Islands, Indonesia. Its status remains an enigma and some individuals were identified as hybrids involving Papilionanthe teres. The species was described as difficult to flower and only producing small flowers. It occurs sympatric with Vanda limbata and supposedly with "Vanda purpurea", which does not appear to be any known species or synonym. Like all members of the genus, this species bears terete leaves on a slender stem.
