= List of national flowers =

Flowers that represent specific geographic areas

In some countries, plants have been chosen as symbols to represent specific geographic areas. Some countries have a country-wide floral emblem; others in addition have symbols representing subdivisions. Different processes have been used to adopt these symbols – some are conferred by government bodies, whereas others are the result of informal public polls. The term floral emblem, which refers to flowers specifically, is primarily used in Australia and Canada. In the United States, the term state flower is more often used.

== National plants ==
=== Africa ===
==== Ethiopia ====
The national flower of Ethiopia is Zantedeschia aethiopica, commonly known as calla lily.

==== Mauritius ====
The national flower of Mauritius is the Ruizia boutoniana.

==== Nigeria ====
The national flower of Nigeria is Costus spectabilis which is commonly known as Yellow Trumpet.

==== Seychelles ====
The national flower of the Seychelles is the tropicbird orchid (known locally as orkid payanke), Angraecum eburneum.

==== South Africa ====
The national flower of South Africa is the King Protea, Protea cynaroides.

==== Tunisia ====
The national flower of Tunisia is jasmine. It was chosen as a symbol for the 2010 Tunisian Revolution.

==== Zimbabwe ====
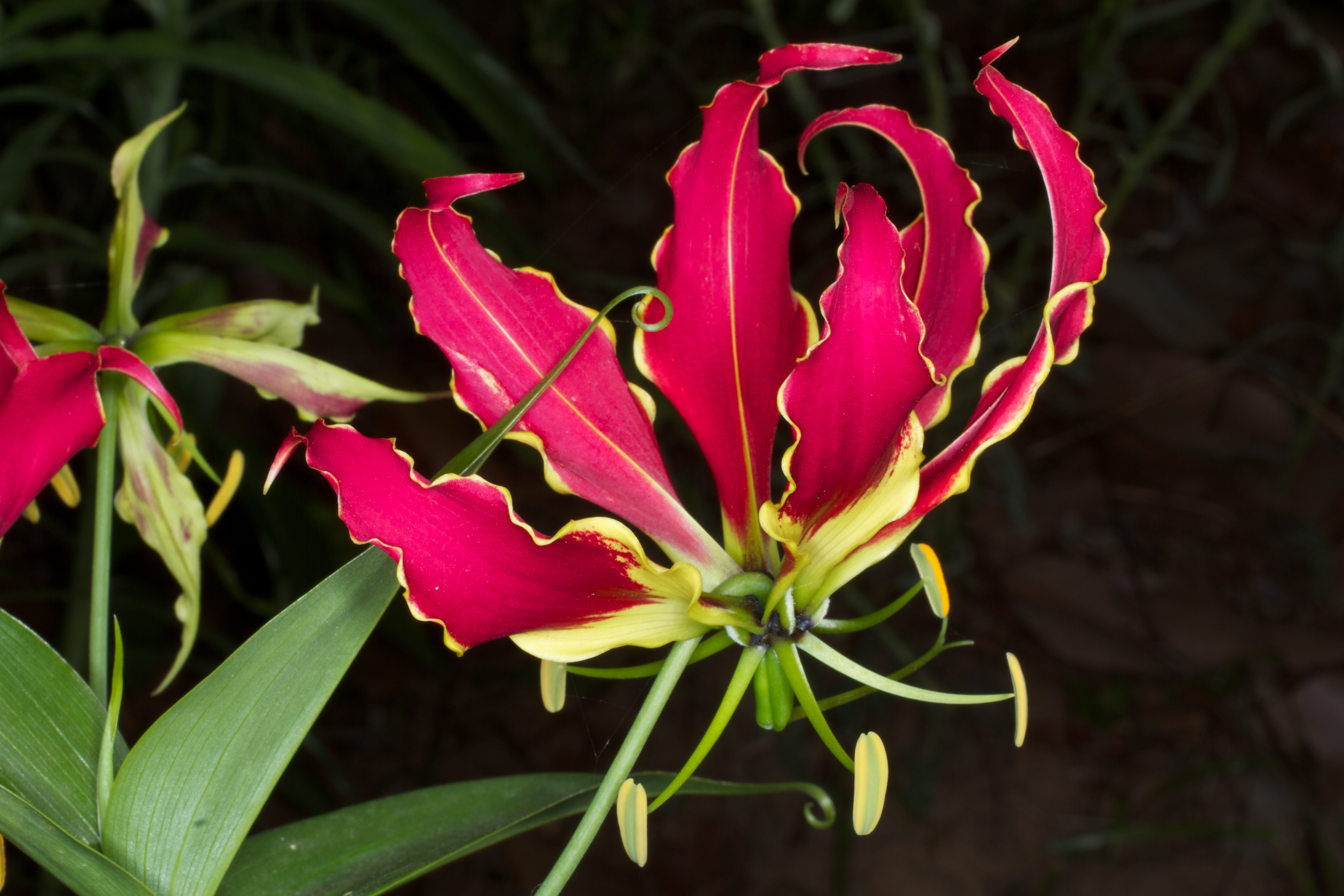
Zimbabwe's national flower, the flame lily.

The national flower of Zimbabwe is the flame lily, Gloriosa superba.

=== Asia ===
==== Afghanistan ====
The national flower of Afghanistan is the tulip. It is called Lala (لاله) in Persian and Khatol in the Pashto language.

==== Bangladesh ====
The national flower of Bangladesh is the water lily Nymphaea nouchali. It is called shapla (শাপলা) in the Bengali language.

==== Bhutan ====
The national flower of Bhutan is the blue poppy. Previously misidentified as the non-native Meconopsis grandis, national flower of Bhutan was identified in 2017 as Meconopsis gakyidiana, a new distinct species.

==== Brunei ====
The national flower of Brunei is Simpoh Ayer (Dillenia suffruticosa).

==== Cambodia ====
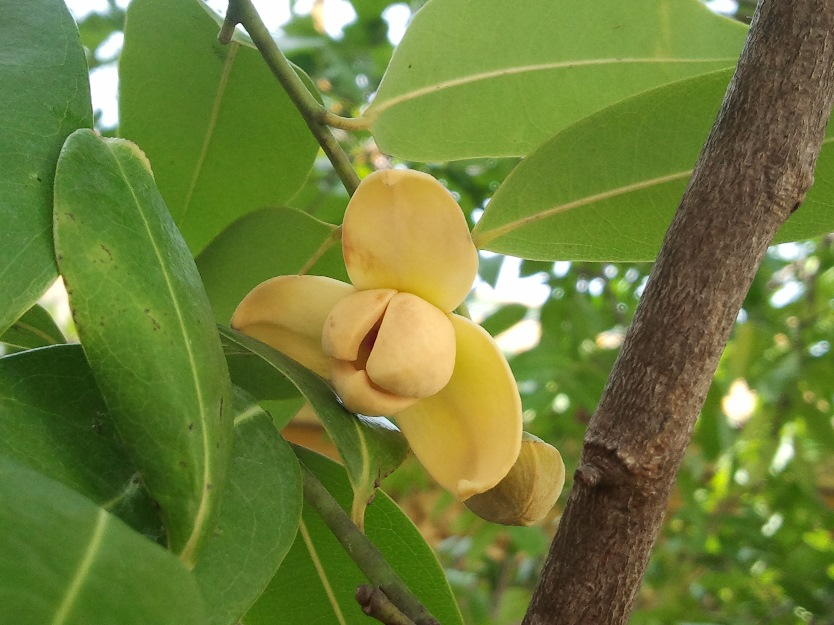
Cambodia's national flower, the romduol

Cambodia formally adopted the romduol (Khmer: រំដួល) as its national flower in the year 2005 by a royal decree. The royal decree designates the taxon as Mitrella mesnyi, however, this is a taxonomically illegitimate synonym for Sphaerocoryne affinis, which does not occur in Cambodia. The accepted species name for romduol is Sphaerocoryne lefevrei.

==== India ====
The lotus (Nelumbo nucifera) is the national flower of India. It is a sacred flower in the art and culture of ancient India.

==== Indonesia ====
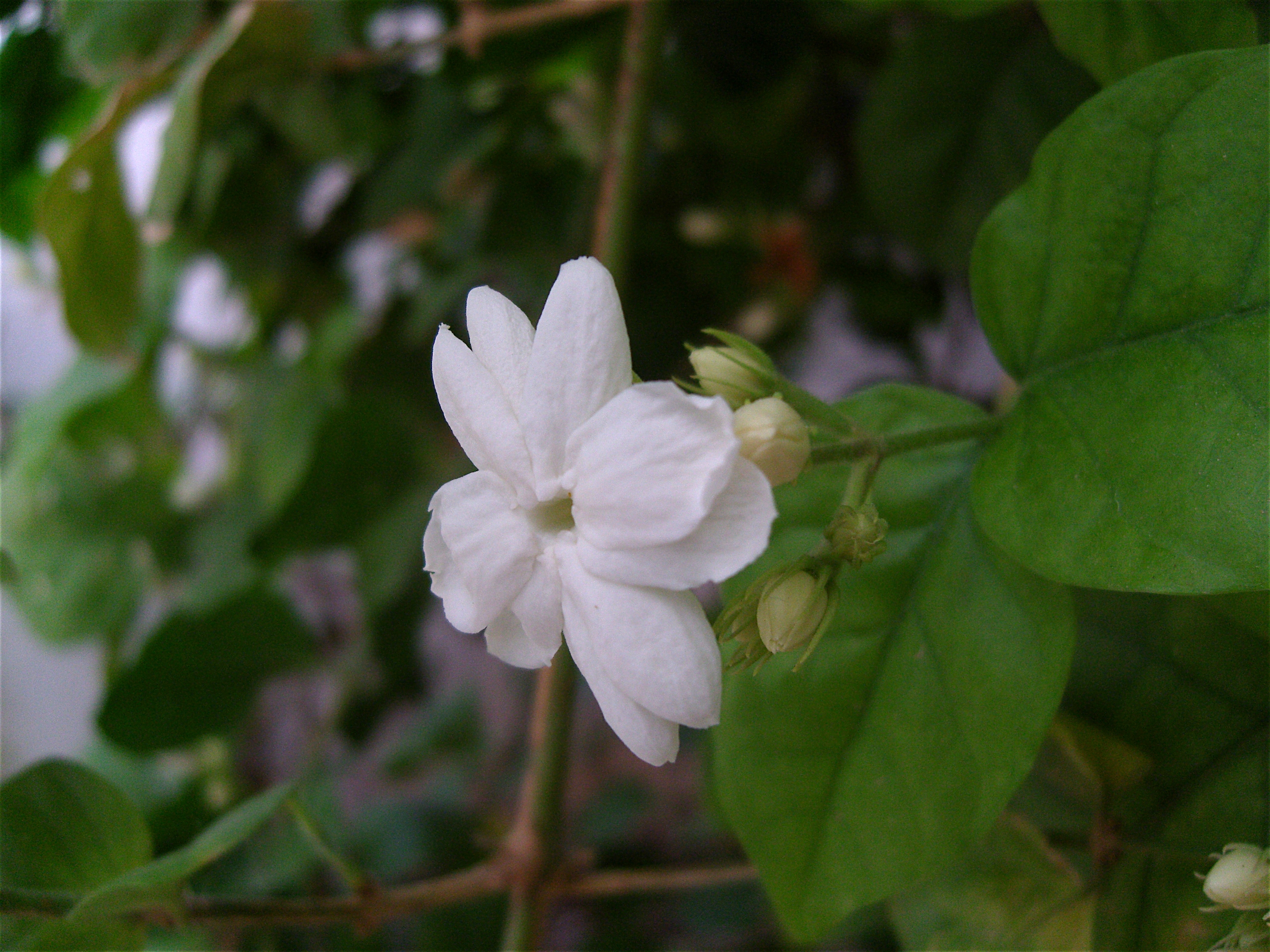
Jasminum sambac, the national flower of Indonesia and the Philippines

There are three types of floral emblems used to symbolize Indonesia:

- The puspa bangsa ("national flower") of Indonesia is melati (Jasminum sambac).
- The puspa pesona ("flower of charm") is anggrek bulan or moon orchid (Phalaenopsis amabilis).
- The puspa langka ("rare flower") is padma raksasa rafflesia (Rafflesia arnoldii).

All three were chosen on World Environment Day in 1990, and enforced by law through Presidential Decree (Keputusan Presiden) No. 4 1993, On the other occasion, bunga bangkai (Titan arum) was also added as puspa langka together with rafflesia.

Melati (Jasminum sambac), a small white flower with sweet fragrance, has long been considered a sacred flower in Indonesian tradition, as it symbolizes purity, sacredness, graceful simplicity and sincerity. For example, on her wedding day, a traditional Indonesian bride's hair is often adorned with arrangements of jasmine, while the groom's kris is often adorned with a lock of jasmine. However, jasmine is also often used as a floral offering for spirits and deities, and also often present during funerals, which has caused it to be seen as having mystical and sacred properties. Moon orchid was chosen for its beauty, while the other two rare flowers, Rafflesia arnoldii and Titan arum, were chosen to demonstrate uniqueness and Indonesia's rich biodiversity.

Each of the 34 provinces of Indonesia also has a native plant as its provincial flower.

==== Iran ====
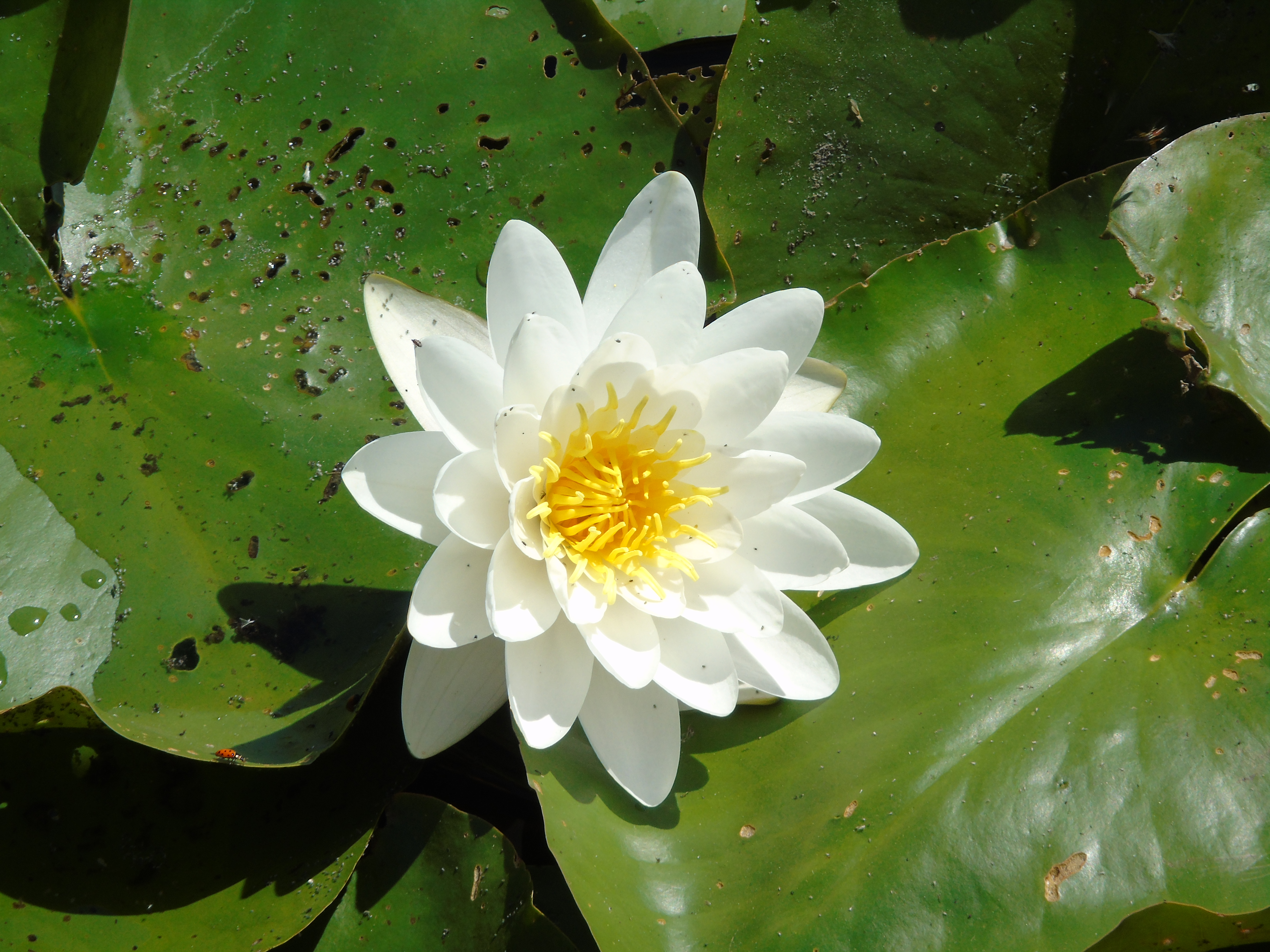
Water lily, Iran's national symbolic flower

The national flower of Iran is the water lily (nymphaea sp.) referred to as Niloofare Abi in Persian. The flower is the national flower of Iran since the Achaemenid Empire era (552 BC).

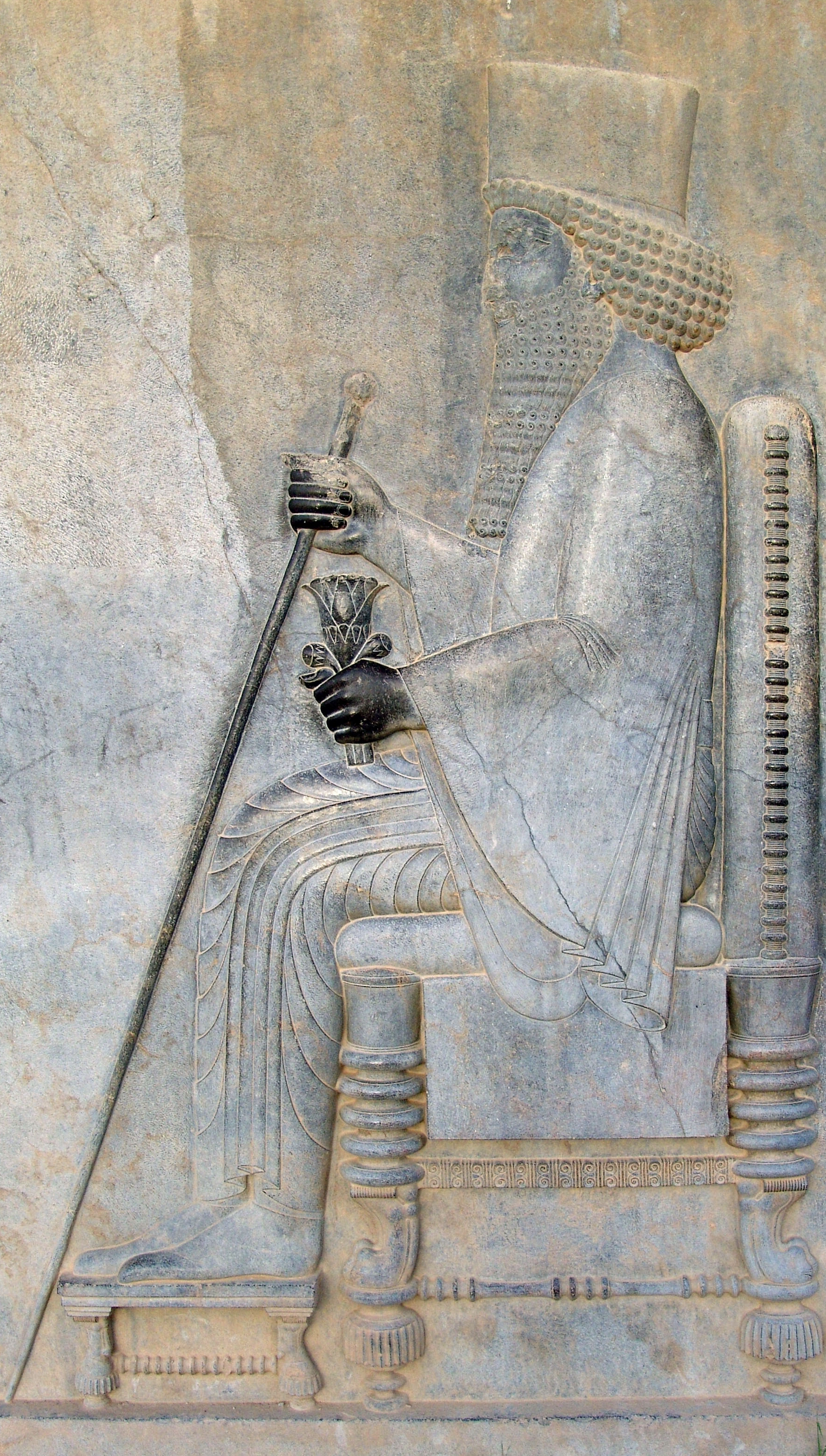
Darius the great holds a water lily In Persepolis

==== Israel ====
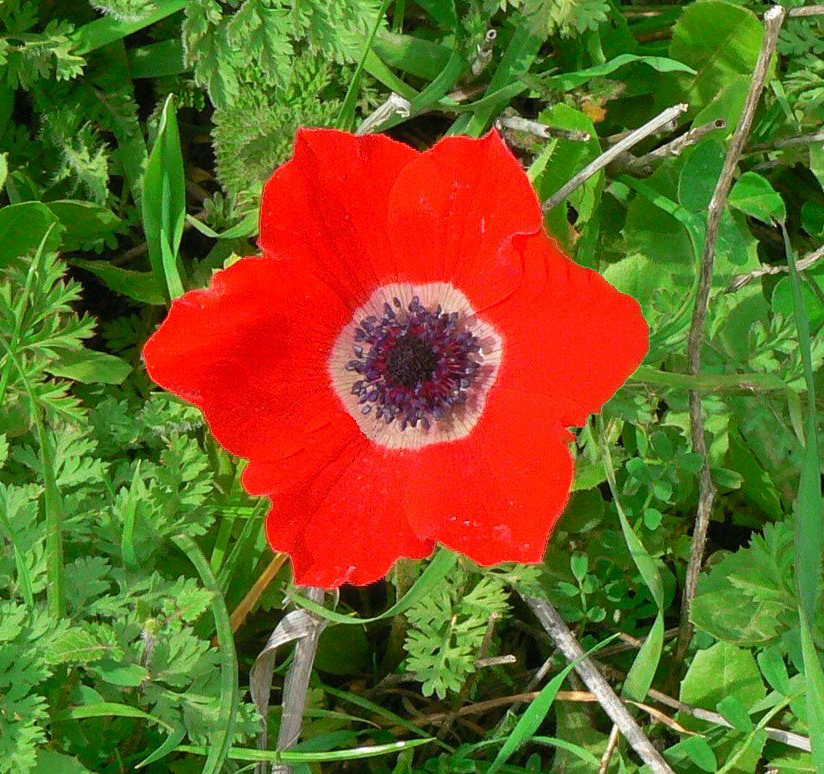
The poppy anemone, Israel's national flower

The national flower of Israel is the poppy anemone (Anemone coronaria; calanit metzuya in Hebrew), chosen in 2013 to replace Cyclamen persicum.

==== Japan ====
The national flower of Japan is the Cherry Blossom or Sakura (桜) Any flowers belonging to the genus Prunus may be termed Sakura.

==== Jordan ====
The national flower of Jordan is the black iris (Iris nigricans).

==== Kuwait ====
The national flower of Kuwait is Arfaj (Rhanterium epapposum).

==== Laos ====
The national flower of Laos is the champa; flowers of the genus plumeria .

==== Malaysia ====
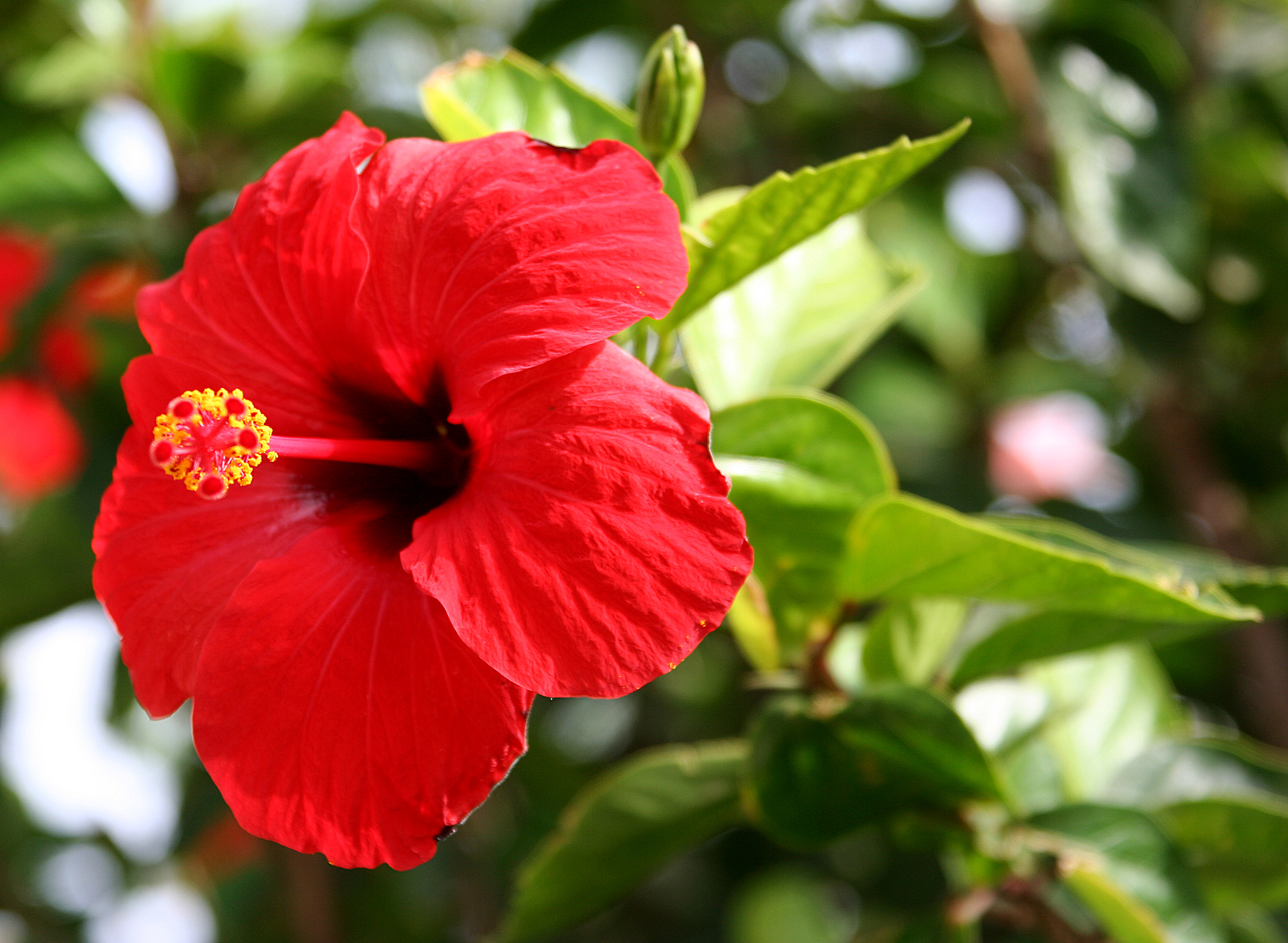
The Chinese hibiscus (Hibiscus rosa-sinensis), Malaysia's national flower

The national flower of Malaysia is the bunga raya (Chinese hibiscus, Hibiscus rosa-sinensis).

==== Maldives ====
The national flower of the Maldives is the pink polyantha rose (Rosa polyantha), called fiyaathoshi finifenmaa.

==== Mongolia ====
The national flower of Mongolia is Scabiosa comosa (Mongolian: бэр цэцэг, ber tsetseg).

==== Myanmar ====
The national flower of Myanmar is Pterocarpus indicus (paduak).

==== Nepal ====
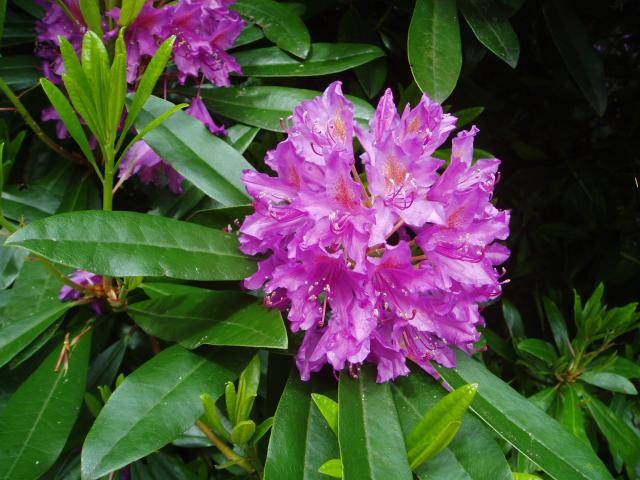
The tree rhododendron, national flower of Nepal

The national flower of Nepal is the tree rhododendron (Rhododendron arboreum).

==== North Korea ====
The national flower of North Korea is the Korean mountain magnolia (Magnolia sieboldii, Korean: 목란/木蘭 mongnan).

==== Palestine ====
The national flower of Palestine is the Faqqua iris (Iris haynei).

==== Pakistan ====
The national flower of Pakistan is common jasmine also known as (گل یاسمن) Jasminum officinale.

==== Philippines ====
The Philippines adopted the sampaguita (Arabian jasmine, Jasminum sambac) in 1934 as its national flower because it symbolizes purity and cleanliness due to its color and sweet smell. It is popularly strung into garlands presented to visitors and dignitaries and is a common adornment on religious images.

Sampaguita in Filipino is a direct loanword from the Sanskrit word "campaka". Plants such as flowers like sampaguita, fruits like mango and jackfruit (nangka), vegetables like ampalaya, Luffa (patola), Moringa (malunggay)as well as names such as those of the Philippine's pre-Christian chief god Bathala (from Sanskrit Bhattara Guru), came from India during pre-Spanish Indianised trade and influences. Among strong traces of Hindu influence in Philippines are placing of Sampaguita garlands around the neck of visitors to show hospitality and friendship, throwing rice over the bride and groom for prosperity, performing paninilbihan, visiting a shrine to pray for fertility, etc.

==== Saudi Arabia ====
The national flower of Saudi Arabia is Royal Jasmine (Jasminum grandiflorum).

==== Singapore ====
The national flower of Singapore is a hybrid orchid cultivar known as the Singapore orchid or Vanda Miss Joaquim (Vanda hookeriana × Vanda teres).

==== South Korea ====
The national flower of South Korea is Hibiscus syriacus. Known in South Korea as mugunghwa (Korean: 무궁화), the flower's symbolism relates to the Korean word mugung, which means "eternity" or "inexhaustible abundance". Despite being made the national flower officially after Korea regained its independence from Japan, mugunghwa has been associated with Korean culture for many centuries, with the Silla kingdom having called itself the "Country of the Mugunghwa" (Korean: 근화향, Romanized: Geunhwahyang).

==== Sri Lanka ====
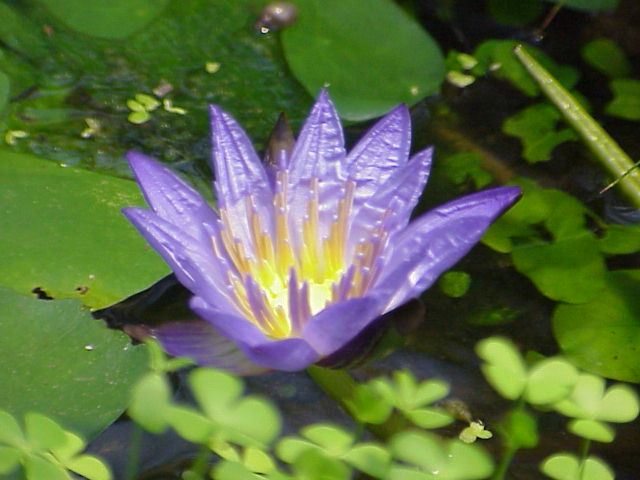
Nymphaea nouchali is the national flower of Bangladesh and Sri Lanka.

The national flower of Sri Lanka is Nil mānel (නිල් මානෙල්), the blue-star water-lily (Nymphaea stellata). Although nil means "blue" in Sinhala, the Sinhalese name of this plant is often rendered as "water-lily" in English. This beautiful aquatic flower appears in the Sigiriya frescoes and has been mentioned in ancient Sanskrit, Pali and Sinhala literary works. Buddhist lore in Sri Lanka claims that this flower was one of the 108 auspicious signs found on Prince Siddhartha's footprint.

==== Taiwan ====
The national flower of Taiwan was officially designated as the plum blossom by the Executive Yuan on 21 July 1964. The plum blossom, known as the meihua (Chinese: 梅花; pinyin: méihuā), is a symbol of resilience and perseverance in the face of adversity, because plum trees often bloom most vibrantly even during the harshest winters. The triple grouping of stamens represents Dr. Sun Yat-sen's Three Principles of the People, while the five petals symbolize the five branches of the government.

==== Tajikistan ====
The national flowers of Tajikistan are the iris (siyahgūsh, сияҳгӯш) and the tulip (lola, лола), officially designated in 2026. The iris, also known as Siyovush flower or Navruz flower, symbolizes purity and rebirth and is associated with the legendary prince Siyovush, whose blood is said to have given rise to the flower. Tulips symbolize youth, beauty and love and are celebrated during Sayri guli lola, a spring festival with pre-Islamic roots in ancient Sogdia and Bactria. Both tulips (Tulipa) and irises (Iris) are native to Central Asia, including Tajikistan, which is home to several indigenous species of both genera.

==== Thailand ====
The national flower of Thailand is the Golden Shower Tree (Cassia fistula). The tree (which is also the country's national tree) is locally known as ratchaphruek (Thai: ราชพฤกษ์), while the flower itself is known as dok khun (Thai: ดอกคูน).

==== United Arab Emirates ====
The national flower of the United Arab Emirates is Tribulus omanense. A creeping plant with bright yellow flowers, it thrives in the UAE's arid climate, growing well in areas such as sand dunes, road verges, oases and desert plains.

==== Vietnam ====
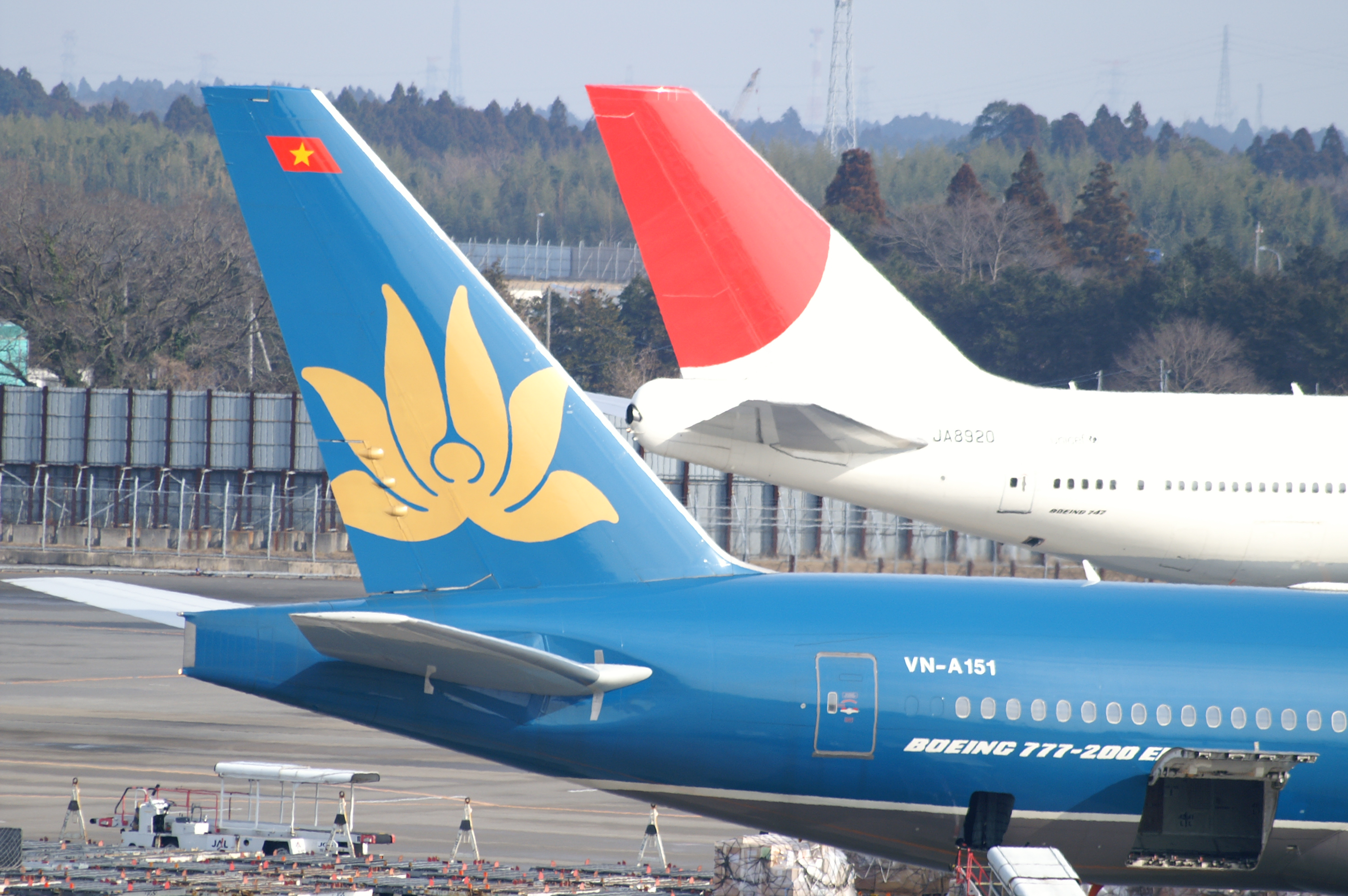
The Lotus flower is used as the logo of national flag carrier Vietnam Airlines

The national flower of Vietnam is the lotus flower (Nelumbo nucifera).

=== Europe ===
==== Albania ====
- Albania – Papaver rhoeas

==== Andorra ====
- Andorra – Narcissus poeticus

==== Austria ====
- Austria - Edelweiss (Leontopodium nivale).

==== Belgium ====
- Belgium – Flanders poppy

==== Bulgaria ====
- Bulgaria – rose

==== Croatia ====
- Croatia – Iris croatica (unofficial)

==== Cyprus ====
- Cyprus – Cyclamen cyprium

==== Czech Republic ====
- Czech Republic – Tilia

==== Denmark ====
- Denmark – The daisy, specifically either marguerite daisy (Argyranthemum frutescens) or oxeye daisy (Leucanthemum vulgare), the latter being native to Denmark and becoming more frequently used. Previously red clover (Trifolium pratense) had been announced as the national flower in the 1930s, but this choice was not popular with the public and it was largely forgotten.

==== England ====
- England – Tudor rose

==== Estonia ====
- Estonia – cornflower

==== Finland ====
- Finland – lily of the valley

==== France ====
- Kingdom of France (12th-19th century) – Iris pseudacorus, fleur-de-lis
- Brittany – Ulex and heather

==== Germany ====
- Germany – cornflower (Centaurea cyanus)

==== Guernsey ====
- Guernsey – Nerine sarniensis

==== Hungary ====
- Hungary - The national flower is the tulip. It is a symbol deeply rooted in Hungarian history and culture, particularly associated with the Ottoman period when tulips were introduced to the country.

==== Iceland ====
- Iceland – White dryad (Dryas octopetala)

==== Italy ====
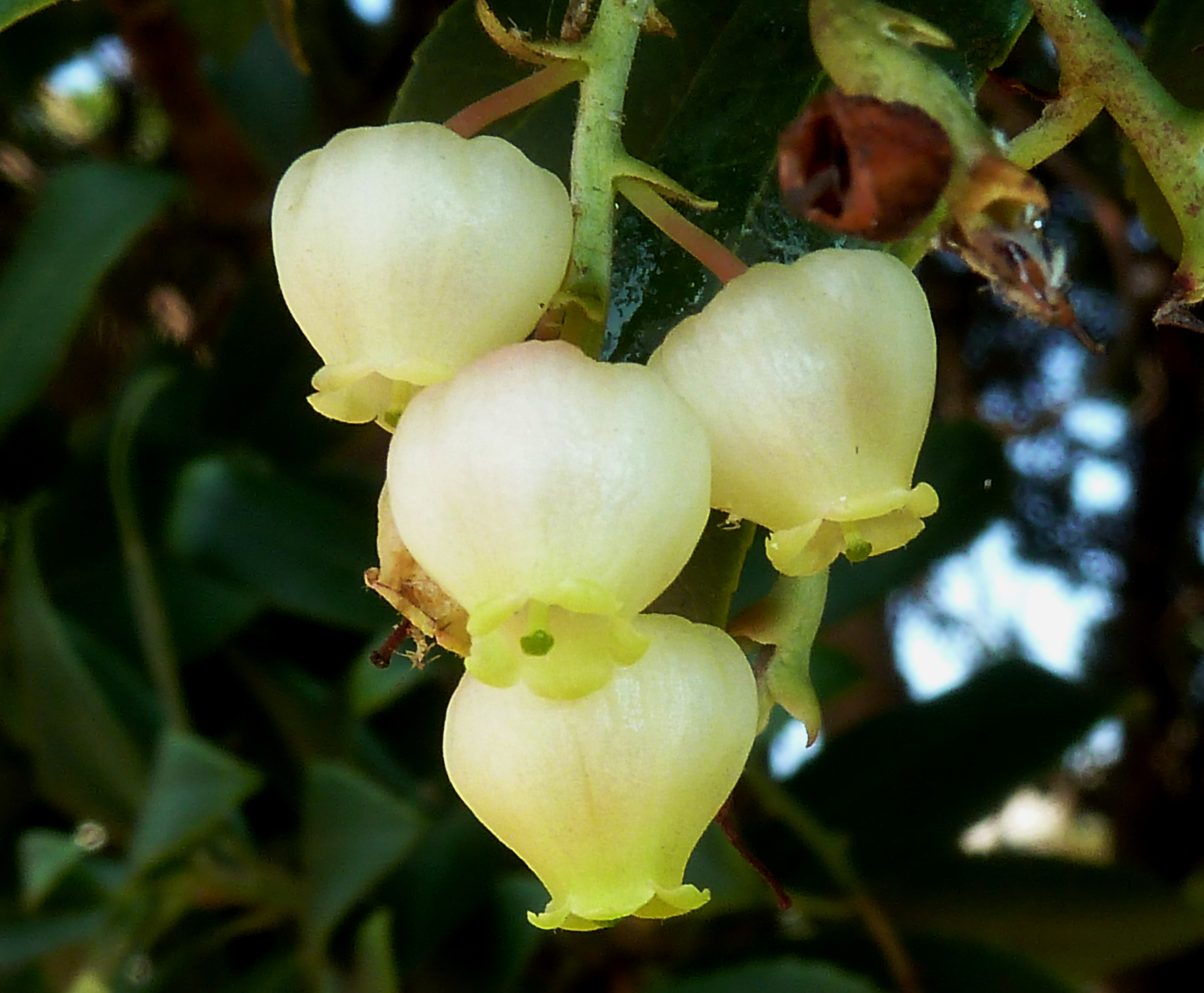
The flower of the strawberry tree (Arbutus unedo) is the national flower of Italy

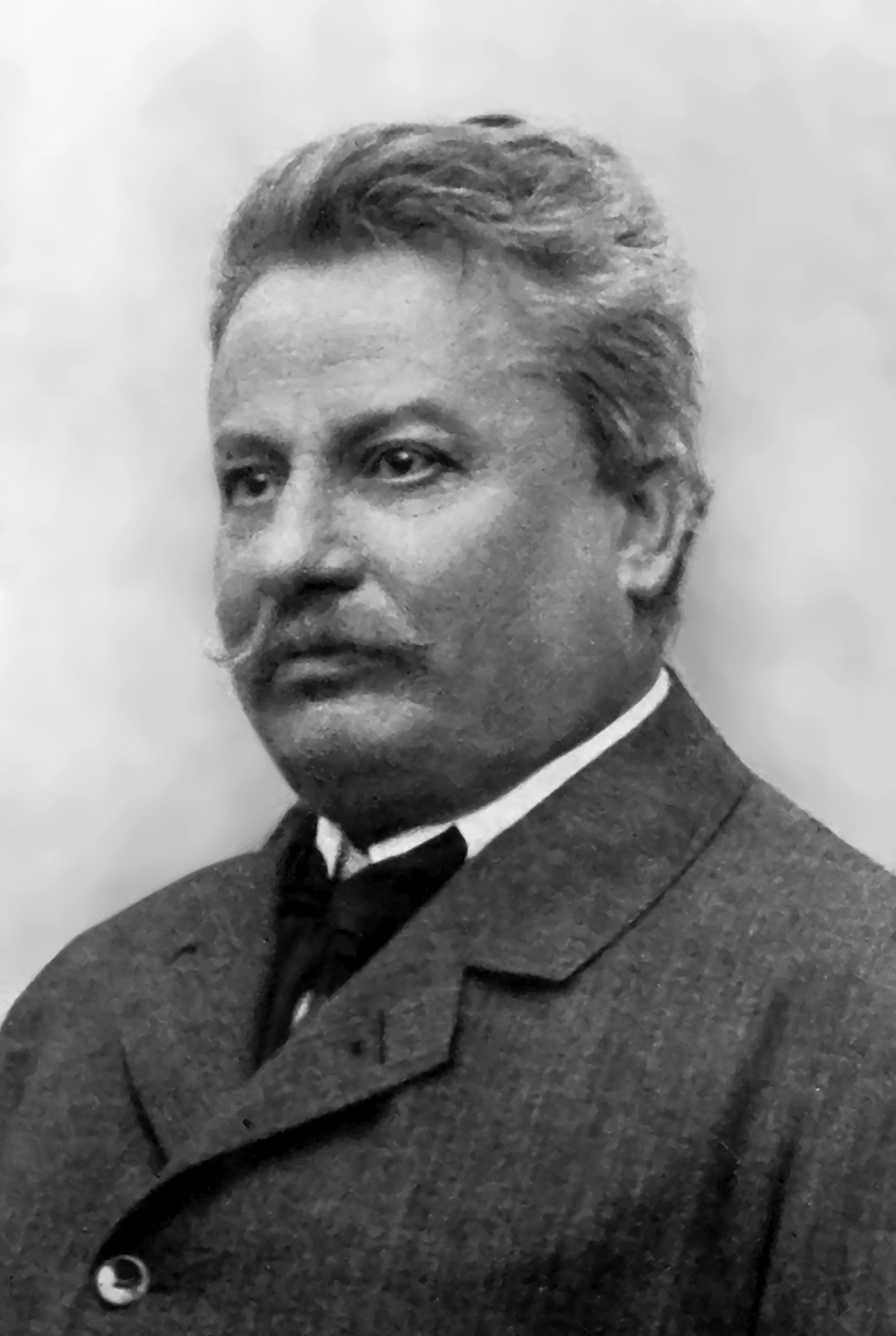
Giovanni Pascoli, an emblematic figure of Italian literature in the late 19th century. Alongside Gabriele D'Annunzio, he was one of the greatest Italian decadent poets.

The flower of the strawberry tree (Arbutus unedo) is the national flower of Italy. The strawberry tree began to be considered one of the national symbols of Italy in the 19th century, during the Italian unification, because with its autumn colors is reminiscent of the flag of Italy (green for its leaves, white for its flowers and red for its berries). For this reason the strawberry tree is considered the national tree of Italy.

The Italian poet Giovanni Pascoli dedicated a poem to the strawberry tree. He refers to the Aeneid passage in which Pallas, killed by Turnus, was posed on branches of a strawberry tree. He saw in the colours of that plant a prefiguration of the flag of Italy and considered Pallas the first national cause martyr. Pascoli's ode says:

(in Italian)

O verde albero italico, il tuo maggio
è nella bruma: s'anche tutto muora,
tu il giovanile gonfalon selvaggio
spieghi alla bora

— Giovanni Pascoli

Oh green Italian tree, your
May month
is in the mist: if everything
dies,
you, the youthful wild banner
unfold to the northern wind

==== Lithuania ====
- Lithuania – Ruta graveolens

==== Malta ====
The national flower is the Maltese rock-centaury (Cheirolophus crassifolius).

==== Netherlands ====
While most people believe it to be the tulip, the actual national flower of the Netherlands is the daisy (Bellis perennis). It was elected in a public vote in 2023.

==== Northern Ireland ====
- Northern Ireland – flax flower, clover leaf

==== North Macedonia ====
The national flower of North Macedonia is the poppy.

==== Poland ====
- Poland – red poppy
- Kashubia region – Kashubian vetch

==== Portugal ====
Portugal does not officially have a national flower, though the lavender is commonly cited. The carnation (Dianthus caryophyllus) is also a symbol of the nation's triumph against the authoritarian far-right Estado Novo dictatorship, known as the Carnation Revolution.

==== Romania ====
- Romania – peony

==== Russia ====
- Russia – chamomile

==== Scotland ====
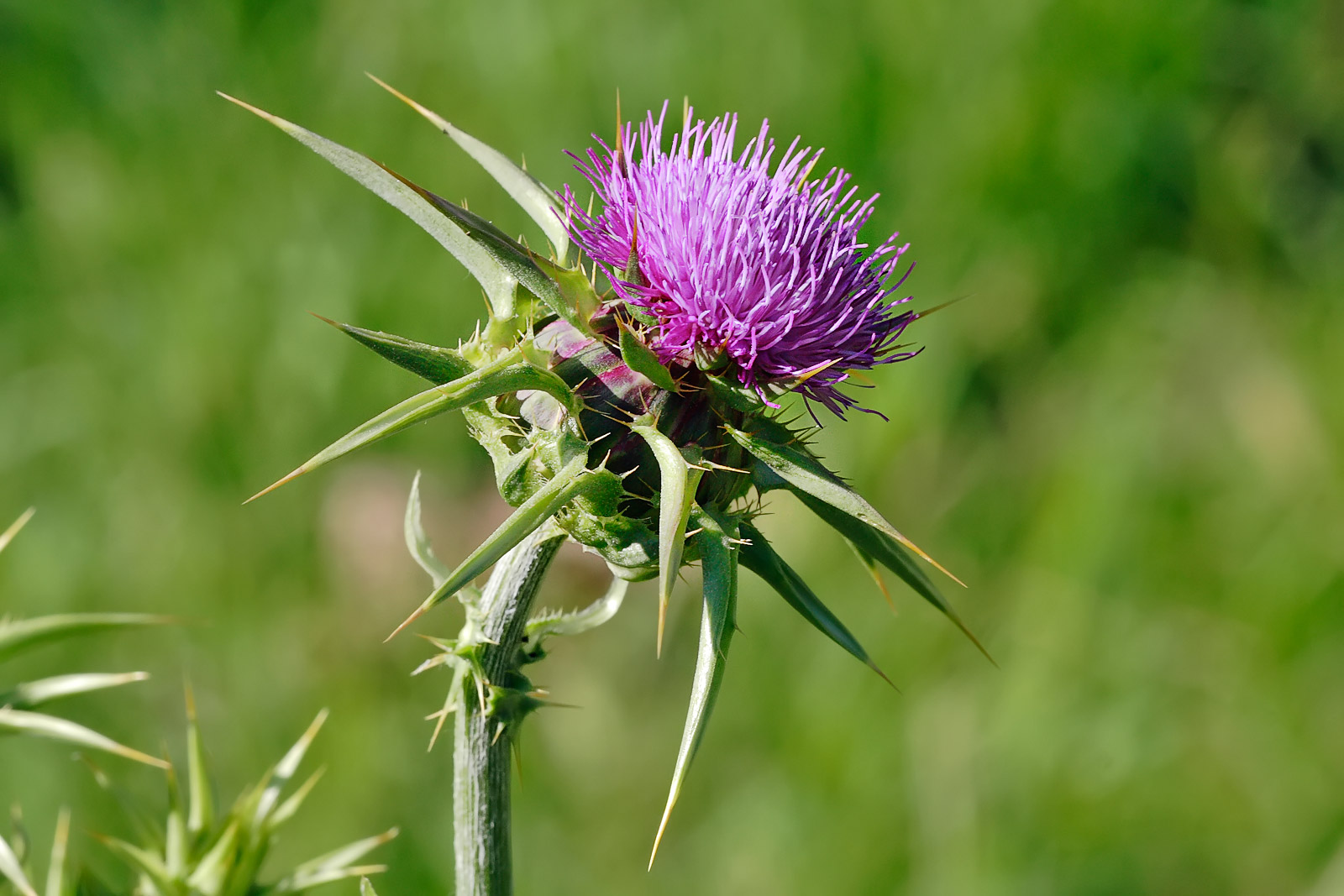
Milk thistle flowerhead

- Scotland – thistle, Scots pine

==== Serbia ====
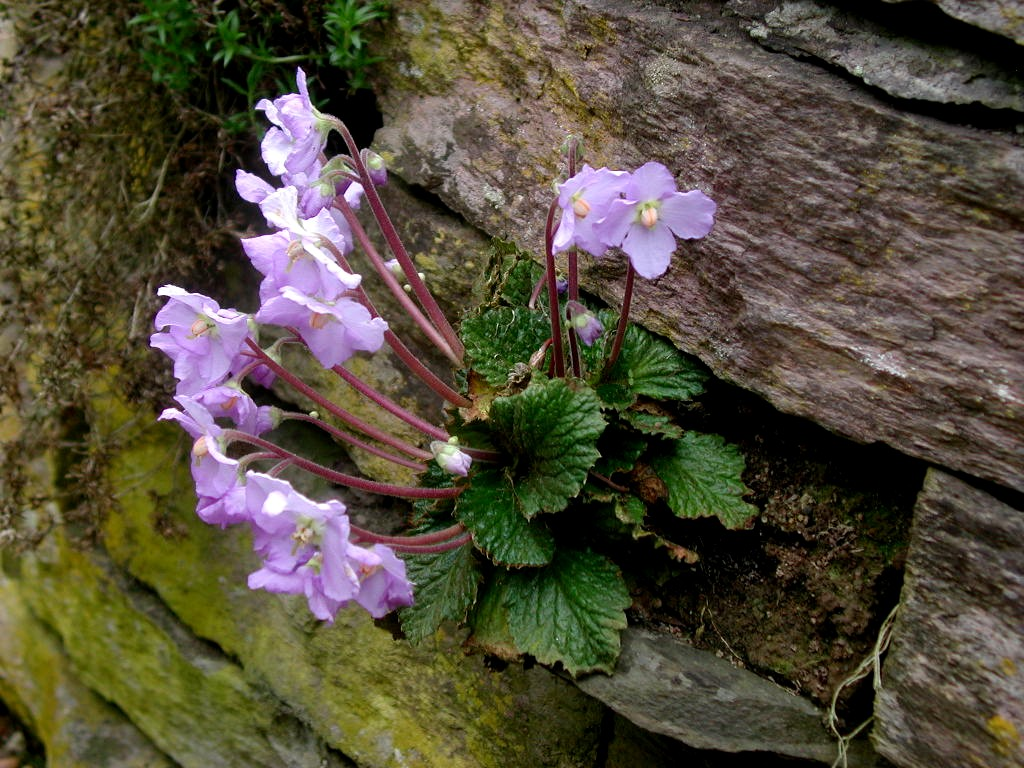
Natalie's ramonda

The national flower of Serbia is Natalie's ramonda (Ramonda nathaliae). It is considered a symbol of Serbia's struggle and victory in World War I, with the country suffering the largest casualty rate relative to its population. To commemorate Serbian soldiers who died in the war, as well as the resurrection of the country after the devastation, people wear artificial Natalie's ramonda as a symbol of remembrance, especially during the week leading up to Armistice Day, which is a public holiday.

==== Slovakia ====
- Slovakia – Tilia

==== Slovenia ====
The national flower of Slovenia is a carnation. It is traditionally present at all significant moments of someone's life. White carnations can be traditionally present at Slovenian christenings and at Slovenian weddings, where the bride has a white carnation flower stuck in her hair and the groom wears a white carnation pinned to his breast pocket or buttonhole. While white carnation represents happiness and celebration, red carnation has a more diverse meaning in Slovenian culture. First meaning comes from French and Russian revolutionaries and symbolises revolution and workers. Red carnations also symbolise love and courtship. In folksongs and folk traditions, when young men in the country villages were calling girls in the night under their windows and serenading them, receiving a red carnation bouquet meant, that the serenaded girl accepted their courtship. Finally, at the funeral of a loved one, their acquaintances, friends and family bid a final farewell to the deceased by each throwing a red carnation into the open grave.

Furthermore, carnations often appear embroidered on tablecloths, handkerchiefs, blouses, bed linen, lace and on parts of Slovenian national costume, such as skirts, trouser legs and traditional headwear, especially avba. Additionally, carnations are often flowers hanging from flowerbeds on balconies and windows, which is a source of pride for Slovenian homes. This can be observed throughout Slovenia, most prominently in Gorenjska and Štajerska regions.

==== Spain ====
- Spain – carnation

==== Sweden ====
The national flower of Sweden is Campanula rotundifolia. It won a public vote in 2021.

==== Switzerland ====
The national flower of Switzerland is edelweiss (Leontopodium nivale).

==== Turkey ====
The national flower of Turkey is the tulip.

==== Ukraine ====
- Ukraine – sunflower, guelder rose

==== Wales ====
- Wales – daffodil, leek

=== North America ===
==== Canada ====
The maple leaf is widely used as a symbol for Canada. The maple tree was officially recognized as Canada's arboreal emblem in 1996.

Canada's provinces and territories also have official provincial or territorial floral emblems:

- Ontario: white trillium (Trillium grandiflorum), adopted in 1937.
- Quebec: blue flag (Iris versicolor), adopted in November 1999.
- Nova Scotia: mayflower (Epigea repens), adopted in 1901.
- New Brunswick: purple violet (Viola cucullata), adopted in 1936.
- Manitoba: prairie crocus (Pulsatilla ludoviciana), adopted in 1906.
- British Columbia: Pacific dogwood (Cornus nuttallii), adopted in 1956.
- Prince Edward Island: lady's slipper (Cypripedium acaule), a species of orchid, adopted in 1947.
- Saskatchewan: western red lily (Lilium philadelphicum var. andinum), adopted in 1941.
- Alberta: wild rose (Rosa acicularis), also known as the prickly rose, adopted in 1930.
- Newfoundland and Labrador: northern pitcher plant (Sarracenia purpurea), adopted in 1954. It was first chosen as a symbol of Newfoundland by Queen Victoria, and was used on the island's coinage until 1938.
- Northwest Territories: mountain avens (Dryas octopetala), adopted in 1957.
- Yukon: fireweed (Epilobium angustifolium), adopted in 1957.
- Nunavut: purple saxifrage (Saxifraga oppositifolia), unanimously adopted by the Legislative Assembly of Nunavut on 1 May 2000.

Many Canadian flags and coats-of-arms have floral emblems on them. The flag of Montreal has four floral emblems. On the right side of the flag of Saskatchewan overlapping both green and gold halves is the western red lily, the provincial floral emblem. The coat of arms of Port Coquitlam has the city's floral emblem, the azalea, displayed on a collar. The coat of arms of Prince Edward Island displays lady's slippers, the floral emblem of the island. When coat of arms of Nova Scotia were reassumed in 1929, the trailing arbutus or mayflower, the floral emblem of Nova Scotia, was added.

==== Mexico ====
The national flower of Mexico is the dahlia (Dahlia pinnata).

==== United States ====
In 1986, President Ronald Reagan signed legislation to make the rose the national floral emblem of the United States. Adopted as representative symbols by state legislatures, each of the 50 states has a state flower and tree. Each of the five inhabited territories, namely American Samoa, Guam, the Northern Mariana Islands, Puerto Rico, and the U.S. Virgin Islands, also have an official territory flower.

==== Central America and the Caribbean ====
===== Antigua and Barbuda =====
The national flower of Antigua and Barbuda is Agave karatto, also known as "dagger log" or "batta log".

===== The Bahamas =====
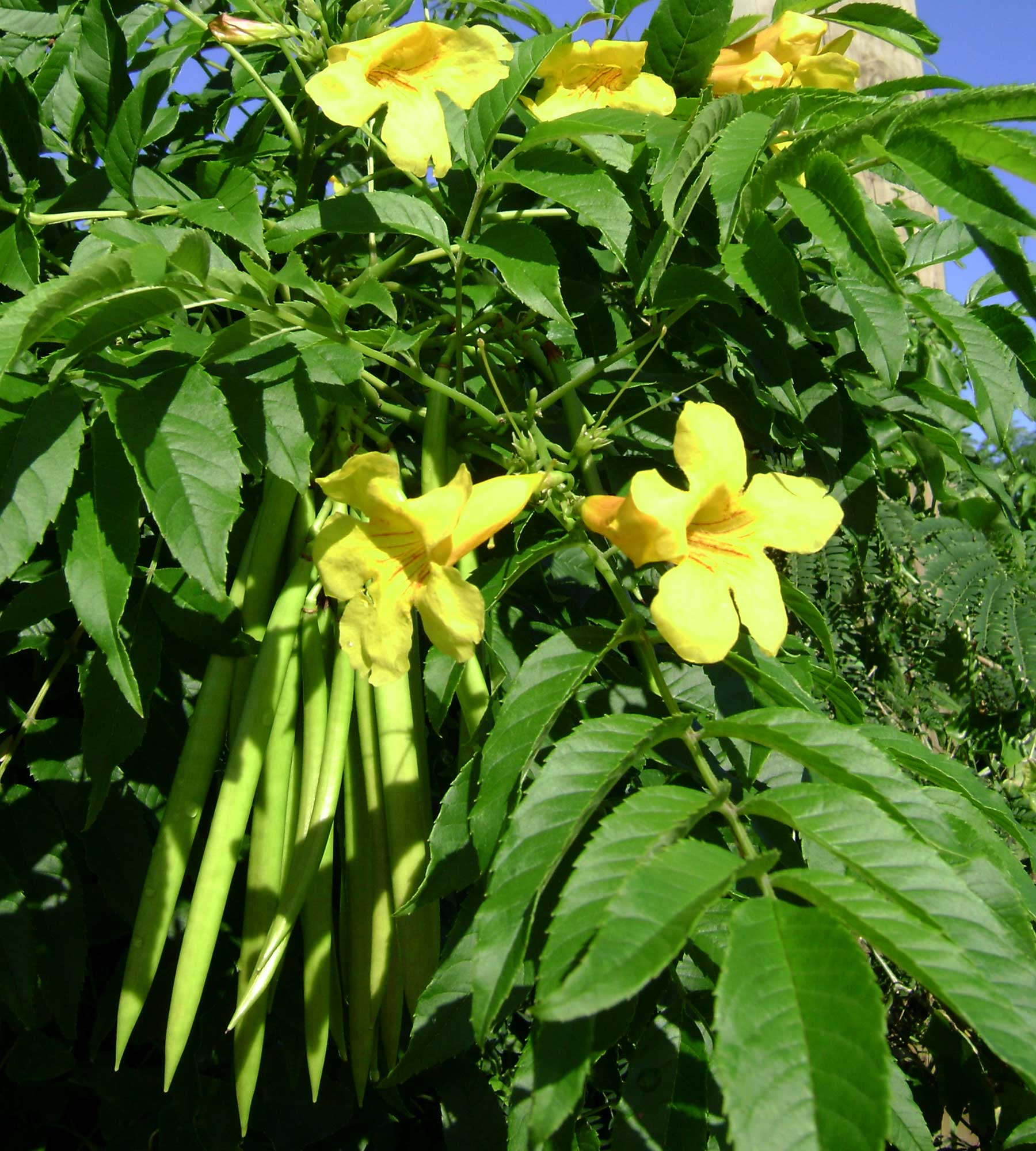
Tecoma stans

The national flower of the Bahamas is the Yellow Elder (Tecoma stans).

===== Barbados =====
The national flower of Barbados is known locally as the Pride of Barbados (Caesalpinia pulcherrima).

===== Belize =====
The national flower of Belize is the black orchid (Prosthechea cochleata).

===== Costa Rica =====
The national flower of Costa Rica is the guaria morada (Guarianthe skinneri).

===== Cuba =====
The national flower of Cuba since 13 October 1936, is the white ginger lily.

===== Dominica =====
The national flower of Dominica is Sabinea carinalis, commonly known as Carib wood or Bois Caraibe.

===== Dominican Republic =====
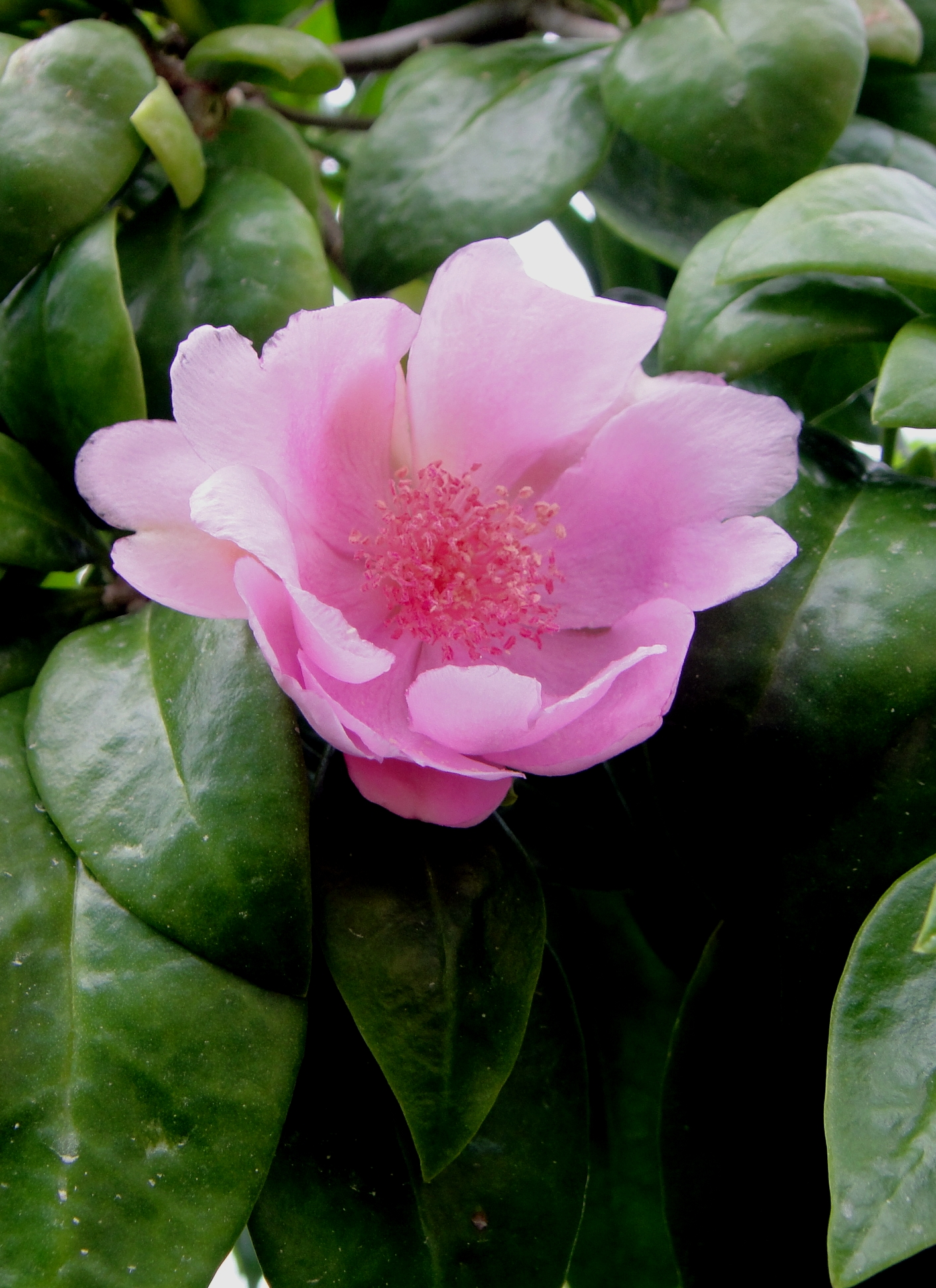
The Bayahibe Rose, the national flower of the Dominican Republic

The Dominican Republic's national flower was originally the flower of the caoba (West Indian mahogany tree, Swietenia mahagoni). In 2011, the mahogany was instead dubbed the national tree, vacating the national flower spot for the Bayahíbe rose (Leuenbergeria quisqueyana) in order to bring attention to its conservation.

===== El Salvador =====
The national flower of El Salvador is the flor de izote, of the Yucca gigantea.

===== Guatemala =====
The national flower of Guatemala is the monja blanca (Lycaste skinneri var. alba).

===== Haiti =====
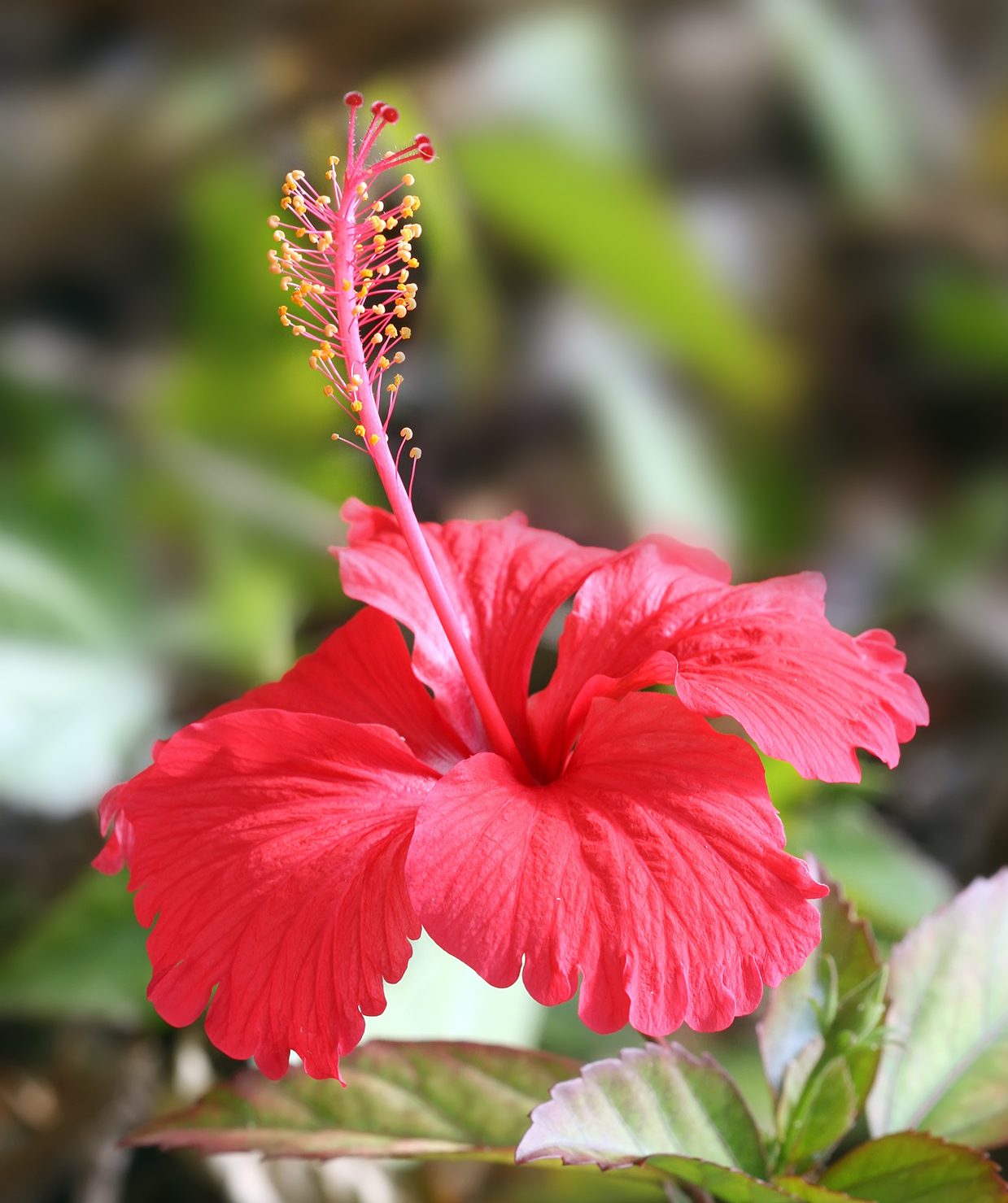
Hibiscus, the national flower of Haiti

The national flower of Haiti is the Choeblack or rose kayenn (Hibiscus).

===== Honduras =====
The national flower of Honduras is the orchid Rhyncholaelia digbyana.

===== Jamaica =====
The national flower of Jamaica is the lignum vitae (Guaiacum officinale).

===== Nicaragua =====
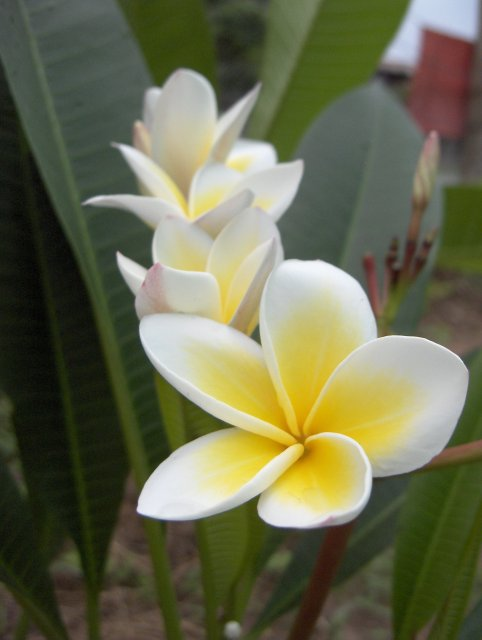
The Sacuanjoche

The national flower of Nicaragua is known as the sacuanjoche (Plumeria rubra), which grows on a conical tree that flowers around May. Sacuanjoche flowers are most fragrant at night in order to lure sphinx moths to pollinate them. The flowers have no nectar, and simply dupe their pollinators.

=== Oceania ===
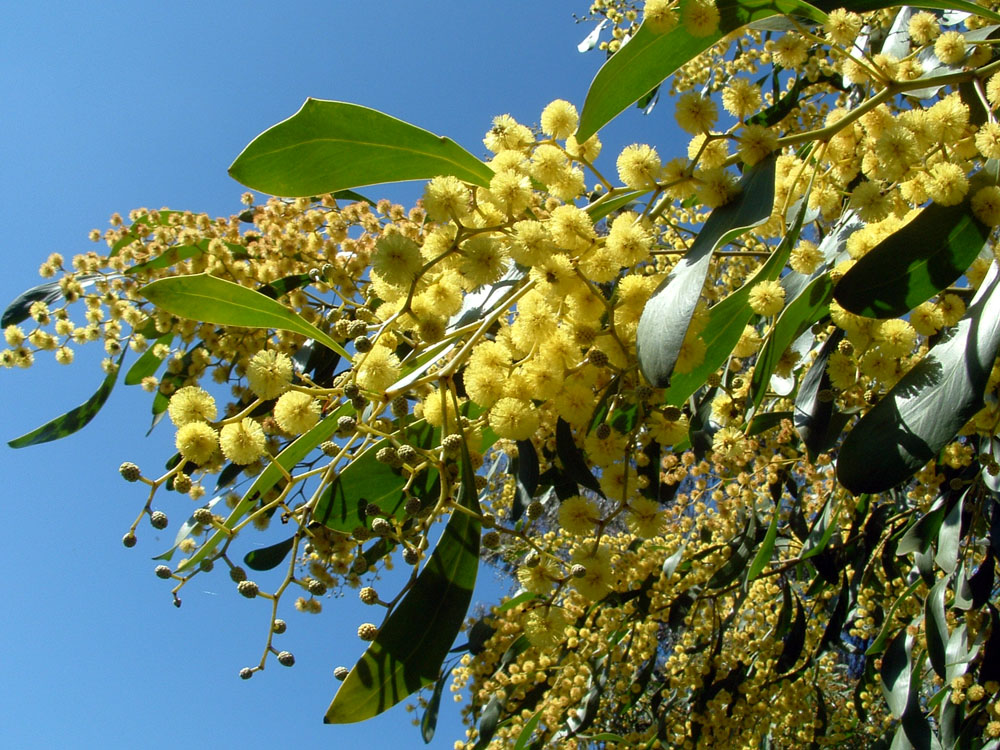
Golden wattle, the floral emblem of Australia since 1988

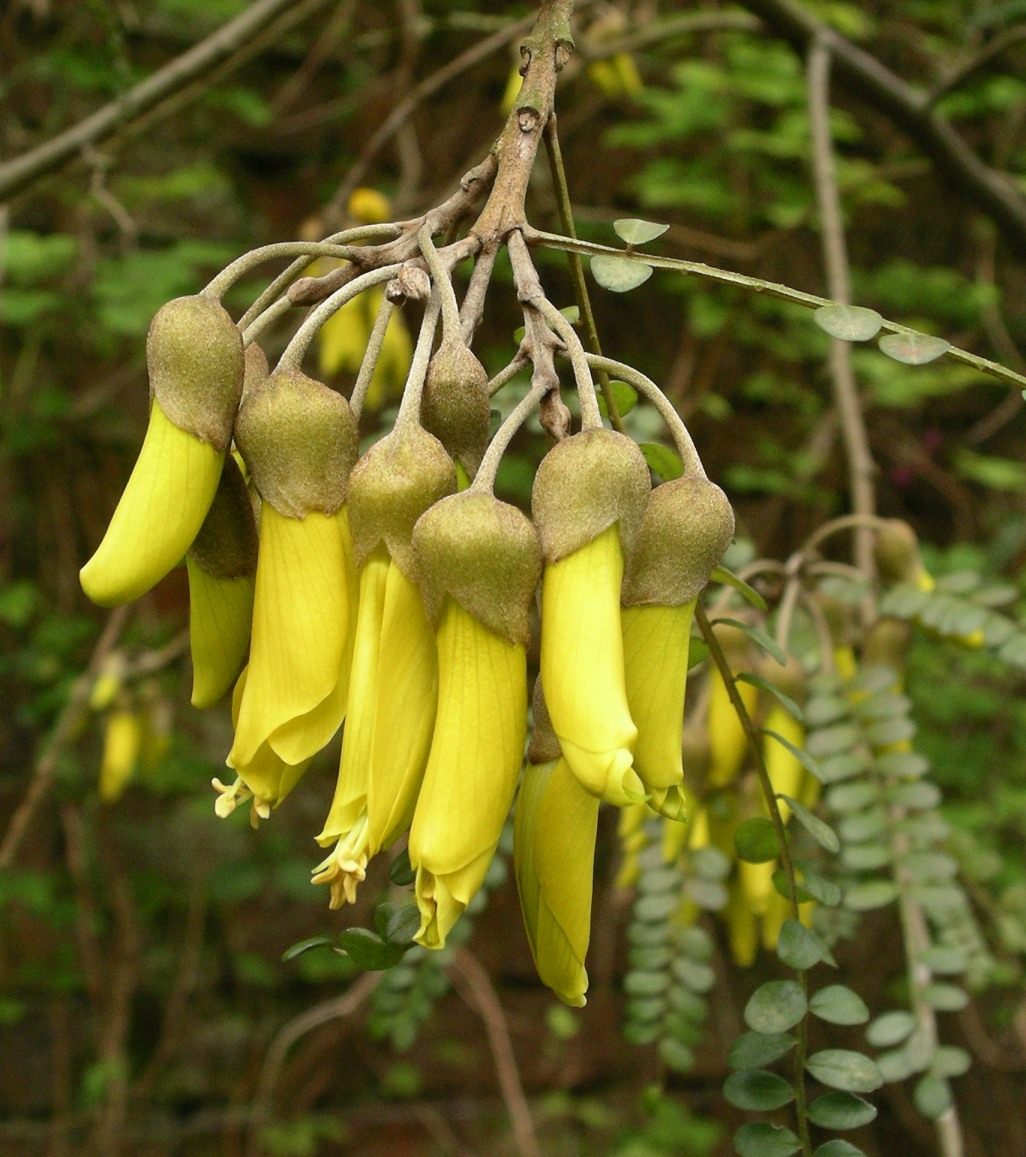
New Zealand's floral emblem, the kōwhai

==== Australia ====
The golden wattle (Acacia pycnantha) was officially proclaimed the floral emblem of Australia on 1 September 1988.

==== Fiji ====
The national flower of Fiji is tagimaucia (Medinilla waterhousei), a vine with red and white flowers endemic to the highlands of the island of Taveuni.

==== French Polynesia ====
The Tahitian gardenia (tiare flower) is the national flower of Tahiti, French Polynesia, and the Cook Islands.

==== New Zealand ====
New Zealand does not have an official national flower, but the silver fern (foliage) is acknowledged as its national emblem. The kōwhai (Sophora spp., native trees with yellow cascading flowers) is usually regarded as the national flower. Other plant emblems are koru (a curled fern symbol) and the crimson-flowered pōhutukawa (Metrosideros excelsa), also called New Zealand's Christmas tree.

==== Tonga ====
The heilala (Garcinia sessilis) is Tonga's national flower. The name of Tonga's beauty pageant, the Heilala Festival, is taken from this flower. Resorts as well as consumer products are also often named after this flower, such as the Heilala Lodge and Heilala Vanilla. The flower is also used in Tonga for medicinal and ornamental purposes.

=== South America ===
==== Argentina ====
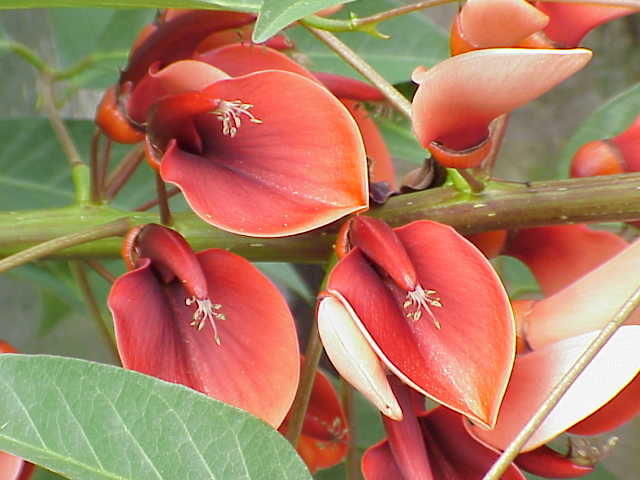
The flower of the ceibo tree, the national flower of Argentina and Uruguay

The national flower of Argentina is the flower of the ceibo tree (Erythrina crista-galli), also known as seibo or bucaré.

==== Bolivia ====
Bolivia has two national flowers: the kantuta (Cantua buxifolia) and patujú (Heliconia rostrata).

==== Brazil ====
Brazil has no official national flower. It is popularly considered to be the flower of the golden trumpet tree (Handroanthus chrysotrichus; Portuguese: Ipê-amarelo) – so much so that multiple proposals have been put forth over the last 70 years to recognize it officially. However, for various reasons, none have ever been voted on by Congress to be ratified.

==== Chile ====
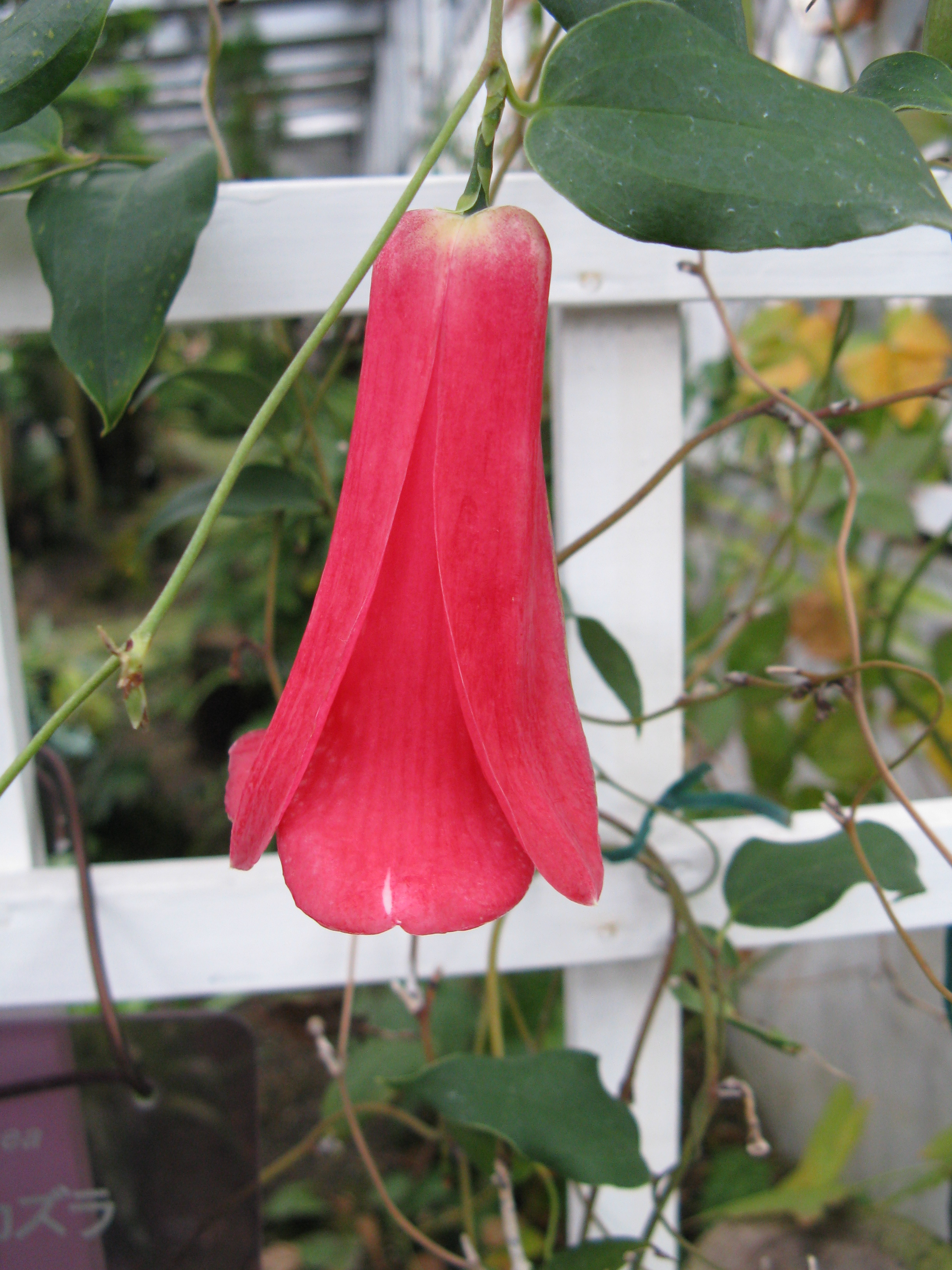
Copihue, the national flower of Chile

The national flower of Chile is the copihue (Lapageria rosea).

==== Colombia ====
Cattleya trianae is the national flower of Colombia and is the orchid which flowers in May. The May flower was chosen because the colors are the same as those of the Colombian flag.

==== Guyana ====
The national flower of Guyana is the Victoria regia lily (Victoria amazonica).

==== Paraguay ====
The national flower of Paraguay is mburucuyá (Passiflora caerulea).

==== Peru ====
The national flower of Peru is Cantua buxifolia (cantuta, also spelled kantuta or qantuta, from Quechua qantu).

==== Suriname ====
Called faya lobi ("fiery love") in Sranantongo, the jungle geranium (Ixora coccinea) is commonly considered a symbol of Suriname.

==== Uruguay ====
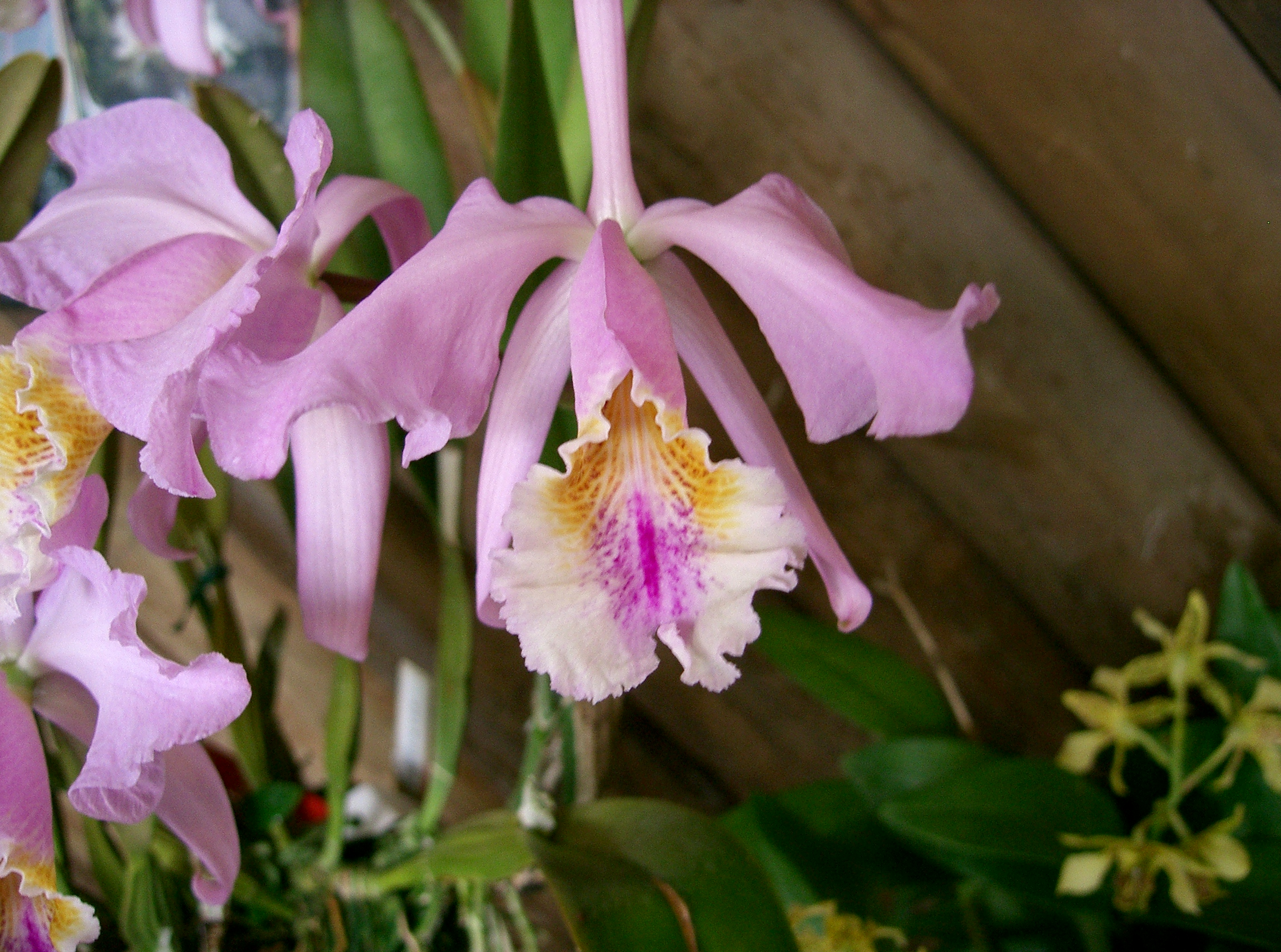
Cattleya mossiae, the national flower of Venezuela

The national flower of Uruguay is the flower of the ceibo tree (Erythrina crista-galli).

==== Venezuela ====
The national flower of Venezuela is the Flor de Mayo (Cattleya mossiae), an orchid.

== Subnational plants ==
Country	Subdivision	Name	Pictures	Notes
Belgium	Brussels	Yellow iris		The yellow iris was officially declared as the regional flower in 1991, chosen for its presence in the marshy landscape where the city originated. The flower has been associated with Brussels for centuries due to its natural growth in the Senne valley.
Belgium	Wallonia	Gaillardia		The Gaillardia emerged as a symbol of Walloon feminist activism through the efforts of Léonie de Waha, a key figure in female education and founder of the Union des femmes de Wallonie. It was later officially adopted as Wallonia’s floral emblem by decree on 3 December 2015.
Canada	Alberta	Wild Rose		
Canada	British Columbia	Pacific Dogwood		
Canada	Manitoba	Prairie Crocus		
Canada	New Brunswick	Purple Violet		
Canada	Newfoundland and Labrador	Pitcher plant		The pitcher plant was officially declared as the provincial flower in 1954, but had appeared on the colony's coinage as early as the 1880s. It can be found in the marshlands of the province feeding on insects that fall into its leaves and drown.
Canada	Northwest Territories	Mountain Avens		
Canada	Nova Scotia	Mayflower		
Canada	Nunavut	Purple Saxifrage		
Canada	Ontario	White Trillium		
Canada	Prince Edward Island	Pink Lady's Slipper		
Canada	Quebec	Blue Flag Iris		The Blue Flag Iris replaced the Madonna Lily in 1999, since the lily was not native to Quebec.
Canada	Saskatchewan	Western Red Lily		
Canada	Yukon	Fireweed		
Sweden	Småland	Linnaea borealis		The Swedish botanist Carl Linnaeus, sw. Carl von Linné (1707–1778), often called the father of taxonomy or "The flower-king", was born in Älmhult in Småland. He gave the Twinflower its Latin name based on his own (Latin: Linnaea borealis), because of his particular fondness of it. The flower has become Småland's provincial flower.
China	Hong Kong	Bauhinia blakeana	The Bauhinia, the national flower of the Hong Kong Special Administrative Region.	The blossom, native to the territory was chosen as the logo of the Urban Council in 1965 and was later incorporated into the flag and emblem of the Hong Kong Special Administrative Region of the People's Republic of China after the 1997 transfer of sovereignty.
China	Macau	Nelumbo nucifera		A stylised depiction of the flower can be seen in the territory's flag.
Ireland	County Offaly	Bog-rosemary		
Pakistan	Islamabad Capital Territory	Neeli Gulmohur; Hybrid tea rose		The floral emblems of the four constituting provinces of Pakistan; however, they are all unofficial and are not recognised by the new Federal Government of Pakistan.
Pakistan	Balochistan	Silver date palm tree Tulipa sylvestris		The floral emblems of the four constituting provinces of Pakistan; however, they are all unofficial and are not recognised by the new Federal Government of Pakistan.
Pakistan	Khyber Pakhtunkhwa	Afghan pine Tulipa clusiana		The floral emblems of the four constituting provinces of Pakistan; however, they are all unofficial and are not recognised by the new Federal Government of Pakistan.
Pakistan	The Punjab	Indian rosewood Sadabahar		The floral emblems of the four constituting provinces of Pakistan; however, they are all unofficial and are not recognised by the new Federal Government of Pakistan.
Pakistan	Sindh	Indian lilac tree Sindhi lotus		The floral emblems of the four constituting provinces of Pakistan; however, they are all unofficial and are not recognised by the new Federal Government of Pakistan.
Pakistan	Gilgit–Baltistan	Himalayan deodar Himalayan Columbine		The floral emblems of the four constituting provinces of Pakistan; however, they are all unofficial and are not recognised by the new Federal Government of Pakistan.
Pakistan	Azad Jammu and Kashmir	Chinar tree/Kashmir maple tree Snow Rose		The floral emblems of the four constituting provinces of Pakistan; however, they are all unofficial and are not recognised by the new Federal Government of Pakistan.
Spain	Catalonia	Weaver's Broom (Spartium junceum)		Usually along with red poppies
Spain	(Galicia (Spain)) Galicia	Gorse flower (Ulex europaeus)		

=== Australia ===
- Australian Capital Territory – Royal bluebell (Wahlenbergia gloriosa)
- New South Wales – New South Wales waratah (Telopea speciosissima)
- Northern Territory – Sturt's desert rose (Gossypium sturtianum)
- Queensland – Cooktown orchid (Dendrobium phalaenopsis)
- South Australia – Sturt's desert pea (Swainsona formosa)
- Tasmania – Tasmanian blue gum (Eucalyptus globulus)
- Victoria – Pink (common) heath (Epacris impressa)
- Western Australia – Red and green kangaroo paw (Anigozanthos manglesii)

=== Norway ===
- Lily-of-the-valley was chosen as the county flower of Østfold
- Globe flower is the county flower of Troms

=== United Kingdom ===
The Tudor rose is a combination of the red rose of Lancaster and the white rose of York.

Each of the four countries of the United Kingdom has a traditional floral emblem:

- England – officially the Tudor rose or unofficially the red rose and English oak.
- Northern Ireland – the flax, orange lily, or shamrock.
- Scotland – the Scotch thistle, Scottish bluebell (harebell), or heather.
- Wales – the daffodil, leek, Tudor Rose, or sessile oak.

==== County flowers ====
A county flower is a flowering plant chosen to symbolise a county. They exist primarily in the United Kingdom, but some counties in other countries also have them.

One or two county flowers have a long history in England – the red rose of Lancashire dates from the Middle Ages, for instance. However, the county flower concept was only extended to cover the whole United Kingdom in 2002, as a promotional tool by a charity. In that year, the plant conservation charity Plantlife ran a competition to choose county flowers for all counties, to celebrate the Golden Jubilee of Queen Elizabeth II.

Plantlife's scheme is loosely based on Britain's historic counties, and so some current local government areas are not represented by a flower, and some of the counties included no longer exist as administrative areas. Flowers were also chosen for thirteen major cities: Belfast, Birmingham, Bristol, Cardiff, Edinburgh, Glasgow, Leeds, Liverpool, London, Manchester, Newcastle upon Tyne, Nottingham and Sheffield. The Isles of Scilly was also treated as a county (distinct from Cornwall) for the purpose of the scheme. The Isle of Man was included, even though it is not a county, but a self-governing territory outside of the United Kingdom with an existing national flower: the ragwort or cushag. The Channel Islands were not included.

A total of 94 flowers were chosen in the competition. 85 of the 109 counties have a unique county flower, but several species were chosen by more than one county. Foxglove or Digitalis purpurea was chosen for four counties – Argyll, Birmingham, Leicestershire and Monmouthshire – more than any other species. The following species were chosen for three counties each:

- Bog Rosemary Andromeda polifolia (Cardiganshire, Kirkcudbright and Tyrone)
- Cowslip Primula veris (Northamptonshire, Surrey and Worcestershire)
- Harebell Campanula rotundifolia (Antrim, Dumfriesshire and Yorkshire)
- Thrift Armeria maritima (Buteshire, Pembrokeshire and the Isles of Scilly)

And the following species were chosen for two counties:

- Grass-of-parnassus Parnassia palustris (Cumberland and Sutherland)
- Pasqueflower Pulsatilla vulgaris (Cambridgeshire and Hertfordshire)
- Common Poppy Papaver rhoeas (Essex and Norfolk)

In addition, Sticky Catchfly Lychnis viscaria was chosen for both Edinburgh and Midlothian, the county containing Edinburgh.

For most counties, native species were chosen, but for a small number of counties, non-natives were chosen, mainly archaeophytes.

=== Sri Lanka ===
The flame lily was designated as the national flower of the unrecognised state of Tamil Eelam by the Liberation Tigers of Tamil Eelam (LTTE), because it contains all the colours contained in the Tamil Eelam national flag and because it grows during November, coinciding with Maaveerar Naal.

== Unofficial plants ==
=== Armenia ===
No plant or flower seems to be among the current official symbols. Some flowering plants from the area include Althaea armeniaca, Armenian Basket, Muscari armeniacum, Papaver lateritium, Armenian vartig (vargit), and Tulipa armena.

=== Azerbaijan ===
Azerbaijan currently has no official national flower. Traditionally, various regions have different designations where national symbols are concerned. The city of Shusha named the Khari Bulbul (Ophrys caucasica) the floral emblem of the Nagorno-Karabakh.

=== Belarus ===
The unofficial national flower of Belarus is wild blue flax, Centaurea.

=== China ===
China currently has no official national flower. Traditionally, various regions have different designations where national symbols are concerned.

In 1903, the Qing dynasty named the peony (牡丹) the floral emblem of the nation. The peony has long been considered a flower of wealth and honor in China.

The puppet state Manchukuo followed Japan's model of dual floral emblems: the "spring orchid" (Cymbidium goeringii) for the Emperor and the imperial household, and the sorghum blossom (Sorghum bicolor) for the state and the nation.

The plum blossom, meihua (Chinese: 梅花; pinyin: méihuā), has also been one of the most beloved flowers in Chinese culture. The Republic of China government named the plum blossom as the national flower in 1964. The plum blossom is symbol for resilience and perseverance in the face of adversity, because plum blossoms often bloom most vibrantly even amidst the harsh winter snow.

The People's Republic of China, established in 1949, has not yet designated an official floral emblem. There have been several petitions in recent years to officially adopt one. However, the government has not taken any action yet. A poll in 2005 showed that 41% of the public supports peony as the national flower while 36% supported the plum blossom. Some scholars have suggested that the peony and plum blossoms may be designated as dual national flowers. In addition, the orchid, jasmine, daffodil and chrysanthemum have also been held as possible floral symbols of China.

=== Ecuador ===
No flower has been officially declared as a national symbol. Unofficially the rose and the orchid are claimed to hold that title.

=== Egypt ===
Both Blue Egyptian Lotus and White Egyptian Lotus are regarded as Egypt's national flowers, and they appear in many Ancient Egyptian paintings and monuments.

=== France ===
While France does not have an official national flower, the fleur-de-lis, which was a symbol of the royal family, as well as the cornflower (blue), marguerite (white), and red poppy, which together represent the tri-colored national flag, are also generally treated as French national flowers.

=== Guinea ===
In a 2018 public vote Vernonia djalonensis was voted as the national flower of Guinea, a decision which is currently awaiting government approval

=== Japan ===
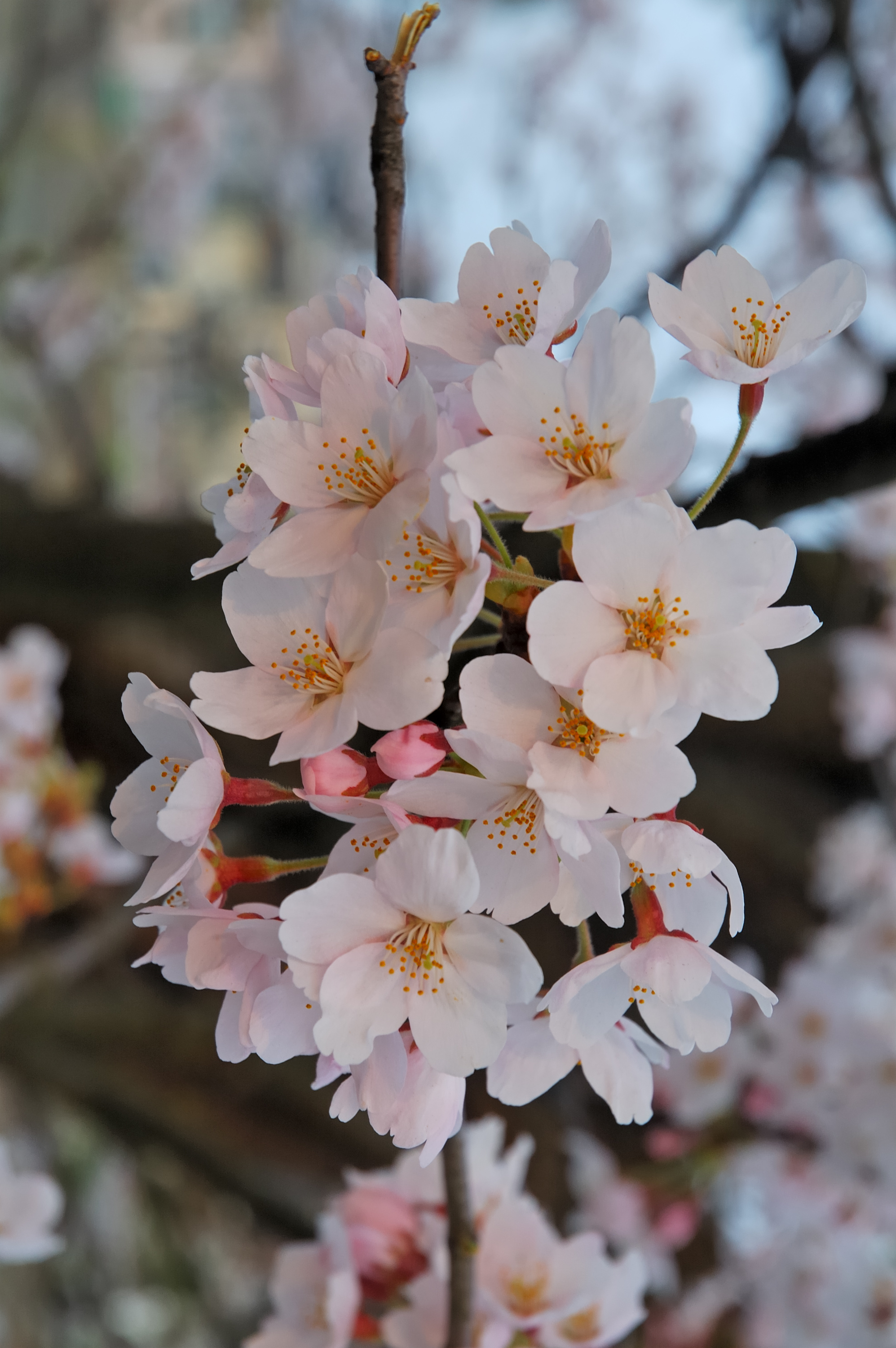
Cherry blossoms

Chrysanthemum morifolium

The cherry blossom and Chrysanthemum morifolium are usually considered the national flowers of Japan.

Japan's national government has never formally named a national flower, as with other symbols such as the green pheasant, which was named as national bird by a non-government body in 1947. In 1999, the national flag and anthem were standardised by law.

A de facto national flower for Japan for many is the sakura (cherry blossom), while a stylised depiction of a Chrysanthemum morifolium is used as the official emblem of the imperial family (Imperial Seal of Japan). The Paulownia blossom was also used by the imperial family in the past, but has since been appropriated by the Prime Minister and the government in general (Government Seal of Japan).

=== Vietnam ===
While Vietnam does not have an official flower, four plants are traditional regarded as the four graceful plants, namely: the lotus, the pine, bamboo, and the chrysanthemum. The lotus (Nelumbo nucifera) is generally regarded as the unofficial national flower of Vietnam, as portrayed, for example, on their postage stamps. In Vietnamese tradition, the lotus is regarded as the symbol of purity, commitment and optimism for the future.

== See also ==
- Tudor rose
- List of national animals
