= Papilionanthe pedunculata =

Scientific classification
- Kingdom: Plantae
- Clade: Tracheophytes
- Clade: Angiosperms
- Clade: Monocots
- Order: Asparagales
- Family: Orchidaceae
- Subfamily: Epidendroideae
- Genus: Papilionanthe
- Species: P. pedunculata

Binomial name
- Papilionanthe pedunculata (Kerr) Garay
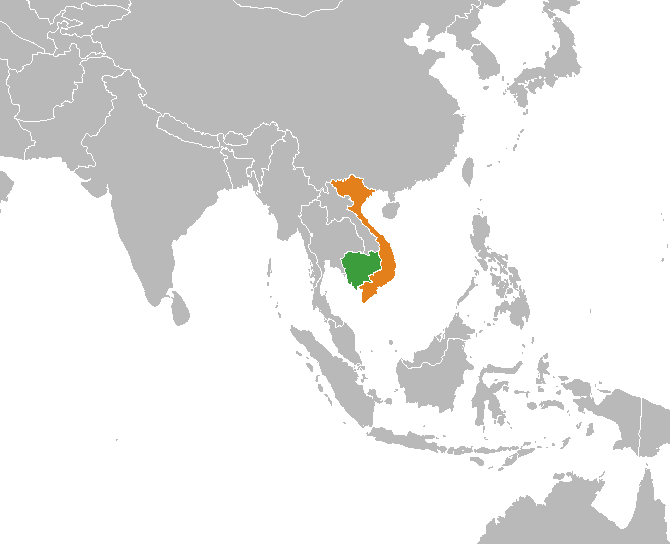
- distribution of Papilionanthe pedunculata

Synonyms
- Aerides pedunculata Kerr; Vanda masperoae Guillaumin

Species of plant

Papilionanthe pedunculata is a species of epiphytic orchid native to Cambodia, and Vietnam. This species is a floristic component of the South Annamese endemism center, which is characterised by isolated, uplifted plateaux and high mountain systems. They are also found in dry lowland Dipterocarp forests in southern Vietnam. The plant has obvious xeromorphic features and is adapted to these dry conditions. The cool-growing plant occurs at 1200 to 1300 m. The plants are large and terete.

== Conservation ==
This species is included in the CITES appendix II and international trade is regulated to protect wild populations.
