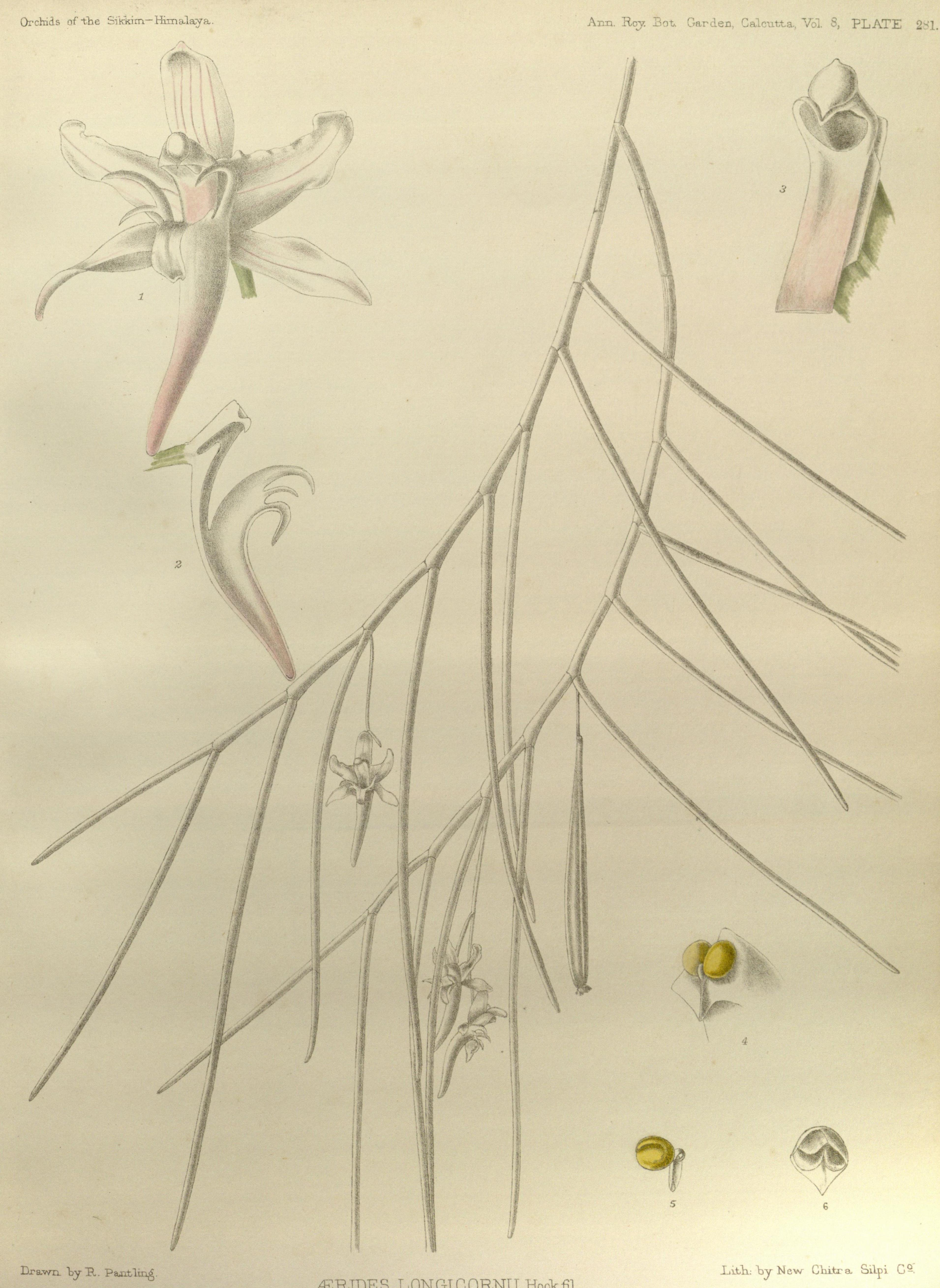

Scientific classification
- Kingdom: Plantae
- Clade: Tracheophytes
- Clade: Angiosperms
- Clade: Monocots
- Order: Asparagales
- Family: Orchidaceae
- Subfamily: Epidendroideae
- Genus: Papilionanthe
- Species: P. uniflora

Binomial name
- Papilionanthe uniflora (Lindl.) Garay

Synonyms
- Aerides longicornu Hook.f.; Aerides uniflora (Lindl.) Summerh.; Luisia uniflora (Lindl.) Blume; Mesoclastes uniflora Lindl.

= Papilionanthe uniflora =

Species of plant

Papilionanthe uniflora is a species of epiphytic orchid native to India, Myanmar, Bhutan and Nepal.

== Description ==
This species of epiphytic herb grows on branches and tree trunks between 2000 and 2100 m a.s.l. It was found on Daphniphyllum himalayense and Ilex fragilis. It is a drought resistant plant. Distichously arranged, terete, 6 to 17 cm long and 0.2 to 0.4 cm wide leaves are produced on slender stems with internodes of 1.5 to 3 cm in length. The leaf sheaths enclose the stem. The specific epithet uniflora reflects this species tendency to produce only one white, fragrant flower with twisted petals. This is however not a strict rule and sometimes more than one flower is produced. The spur is 1.7 cm long and is thus relatively large in relation to the sepals and petals. It may show a pink or violet suffusion at the tip. Flowering occurs from March to April or September to October.

== Phytochemistry ==
Cytotoxic effects were examined and plant extracts were demonstrated to be significantly effective cell growth inhibitors of HeLa cells. Extracts of the plant contain a high flavonoid content (90 mg QE/g). The extracts contain alkaloids, flavonoids, steroids, terpenoids and tannins. Saponins were not present.

== Conservation ==
This species is included in the CITES appendix II and thus its trade is regulated.
