= Papilionanthe cylindrica =

Scientific classification
- Kingdom: Plantae
- Clade: Tracheophytes
- Clade: Angiosperms
- Clade: Monocots
- Order: Asparagales
- Family: Orchidaceae
- Subfamily: Epidendroideae
- Genus: Papilionanthe
- Species: P. cylindrica

Binomial name
- Papilionanthe cylindrica (Lindl.) Seidenf.
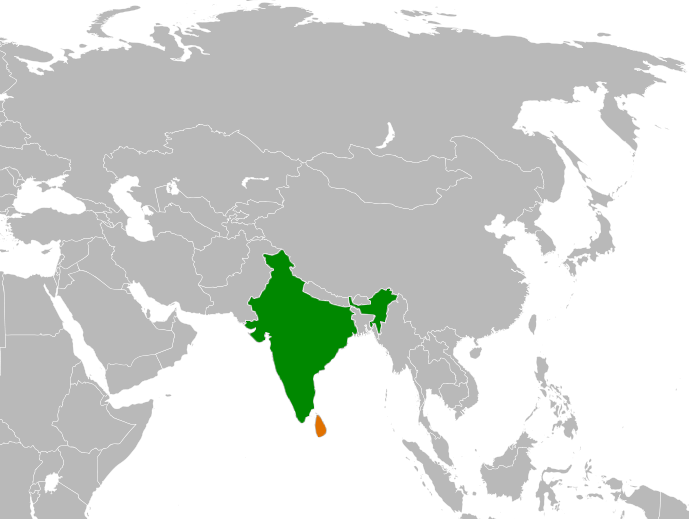
- distribution of Papilionanthe cylindrica

Synonyms
- Aerides cylindrica Lindl.; Cymbidium cylindricum B.Heyne ex Wall.

Species of plant

Papilionanthe cylindrica is a species of epiphytic orchid native to India, and Sri Lanka. This species has been recorded in intermediate zones with dry grasslands on hilltops and upper slopes of isolated hills. Flowering occurs from February to June and flowers are very showy, fragrant and white. The three-lobed labellum is yellow at the tip and pink with white spots below.

== Conservation ==
This species is included in the CITES appendix II and international trade is regulated to protect wild populations.
