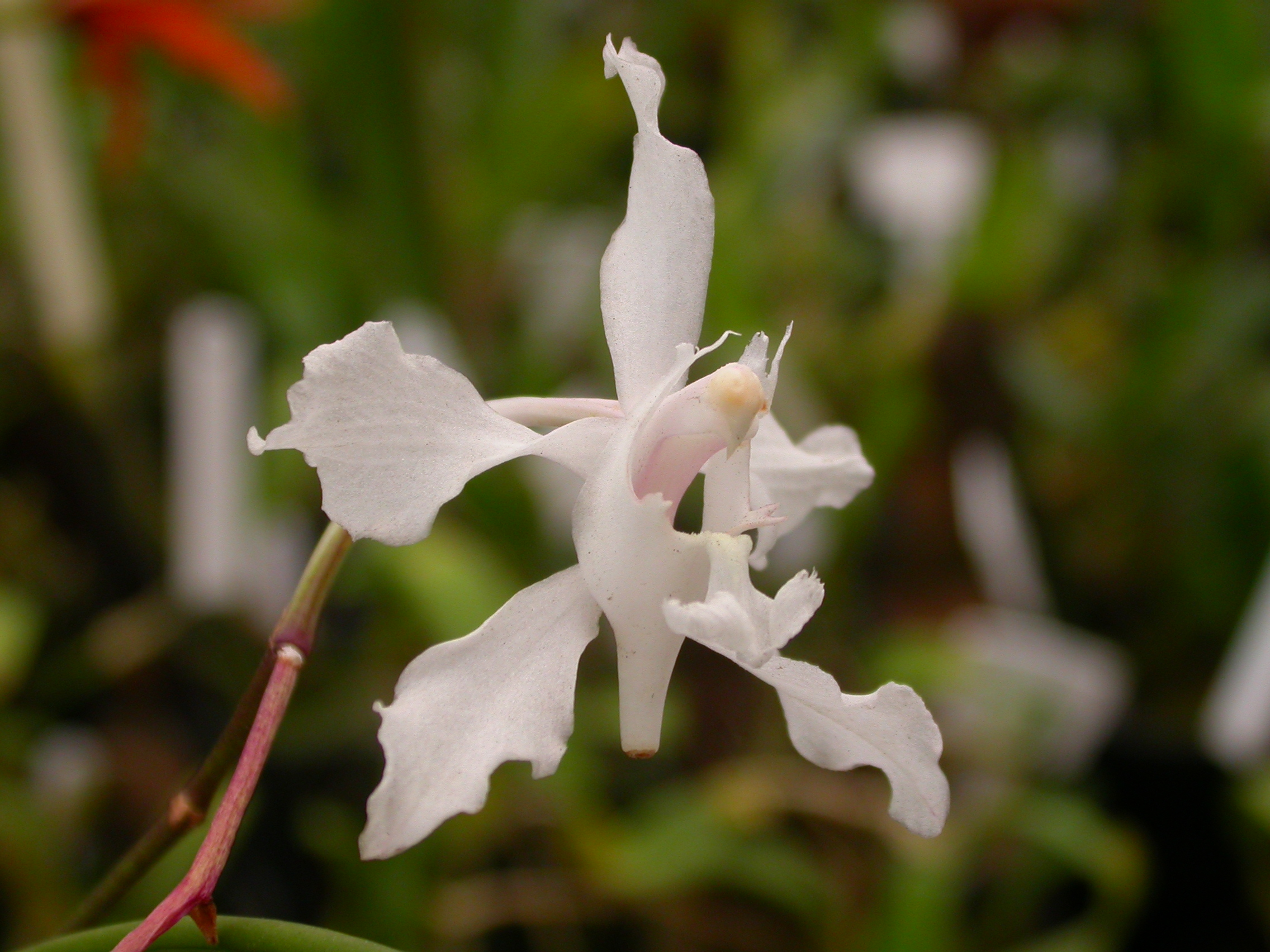
- Papilionanthe vandarum

Scientific classification
- Kingdom: Plantae
- Clade: Tracheophytes
- Clade: Angiosperms
- Clade: Monocots
- Order: Asparagales
- Family: Orchidaceae
- Subfamily: Epidendroideae
- Tribe: Vandeae
- Subtribe: Aeridinae
- Genus: Papilionanthe; Schltr.

= Papilionanthe =

Genus of orchids

Papilionanthe (abbreviated Ple.) is a genus of flowering plants from the orchid family, Orchidaceae. It is native to Southeast Asia, southern China, and the Indian subcontinent. Papillionanthe species are leaf succulents resembling Curio repens (syn. Senecio repens, Kleinia repens).

== Species ==
- Papilionanthe biswasiana (Ghose & Mukerjee) Garay – Yunnan, Myanmar, Thailand
- Papilionanthe greenii (W.W.Sm.) Garay – Bhutan
- Papilionanthe hookeriana (Rchb.f.) Schltr. – Thailand, Vietnam, Malaysia, Borneo, Sumatra
- Papilionanthe pedunculata (Kerr) Garay – Cambodia, Vietnam
- Papilionanthe sillemiana (Rchb.f.) Garay – Myanmar
- Papilionanthe cylindrica (Lindl.) Seidenf. - India, Sri Lanka
- Papilionanthe teres (Roxb.) Schltr. – Yunnan, Bangladesh, Assam, Bhutan, India, Laos, Myanmar, Nepal, Thailand, Vietnam; naturalized in Fiji and Caroline Islands
- Papilionanthe tricuspidata (J.J.Sm.) Garay – Bali, Lombok, Timor
- Papilionanthe uniflora (Lindl.) Garay – Himalayas, Nepal, Bhutan, Assam
- Papilionanthe vandarum (Rchb.f.) Garay – Himalayas, Nepal, Bhutan, Assam, Myanmar, China

== Formerly included taxa ==
- Papilionanthe subulata (Willd.) Garay from Borneo, Cambodia, Malaya, Thailand is a synonym of Thrixspermum filiforme
- Papilionanthe taiwaniana (S.S.Ying) Ormerod was formerly included as a species of the genus, but has since been re-classified as a hybrid of Papilionanthe teres and Luisia megasepala. It has been transferred to the nothogenus × Papilisia as × Papilisia taiwaniana (S.S.Ying) J.M.H.Shaw. Papilionanthe teres is not native to Taiwan, but has been introduced to the island. The other parent species Luisia megasepala is an endemic Taiwanese species.

== Hybrids ==
Papilionanthe Miss Joaquim is a hybrid of Papilionanthe teres and Papilionanthe hookeriana. It is the national flower of Singapore.

Hybrids of Papilionanthe with other genera are placed in the following nothogenera:

- Papilionanda (Pda.) = Papilionanthe × Vanda
- × Papilisia = Papilionanthe × Luisia
