= Papilionanthe sillemiana =

Scientific classification
- Kingdom: Plantae
- Clade: Tracheophytes
- Clade: Angiosperms
- Clade: Monocots
- Order: Asparagales
- Family: Orchidaceae
- Subfamily: Epidendroideae
- Genus: Papilionanthe
- Species: P. sillemiana

Binomial name
- Papilionanthe sillemiana (Rchb.f.) Garay
- distribution of Papilionanthe sillemiana

Synonyms
- Aerides sillemiana (Rchb.f.) Garay; Sarcochilus sillemianus Rchb.f.; Thrixspermum sillemianum Rchb.f.

Species of plant

Papilionanthe sillemiana is a species of epiphytic orchid endemic to Myanmar.

== Conservation ==
This species is included in the CITES appendix II and international trade is regulated to protect wild populations. It is considered endangered (EN) by the IUCN.
