= Papilionanthe greenii =

Conservation status
- Least Concern (IUCN 3.1)

Scientific classification
- Kingdom: Plantae
- Clade: Tracheophytes
- Clade: Angiosperms
- Clade: Monocots
- Order: Asparagales
- Family: Orchidaceae
- Subfamily: Epidendroideae
- Genus: Papilionanthe
- Species: P. greenii

Binomial name
- Papilionanthe greenii (W.W.Sm.) Garay
- distribution of Papilionanthe greenii >

Synonyms
- Aerides greenii W.W.Sm.

Species of plant

Papilionanthe greenii is a species of epiphytic orchid native to Bhutan.

== Ecology ==
This species has been recorded growing in subtropical lowland moist forests on Magnolia champaca (syn. Michelia champaca), Delonix regia, Lagerstroemia parviflora, Terminalia elliptica (syn. Terminalia tomentosa), and Samanea saman. The general habitat is subtropical lowland moist forest.

== Conservation ==
This species is included in the CITES appendix II and thus its trade is regulated. However, the assessment of the IUCN red list categorizes this species as least concern (LC).
