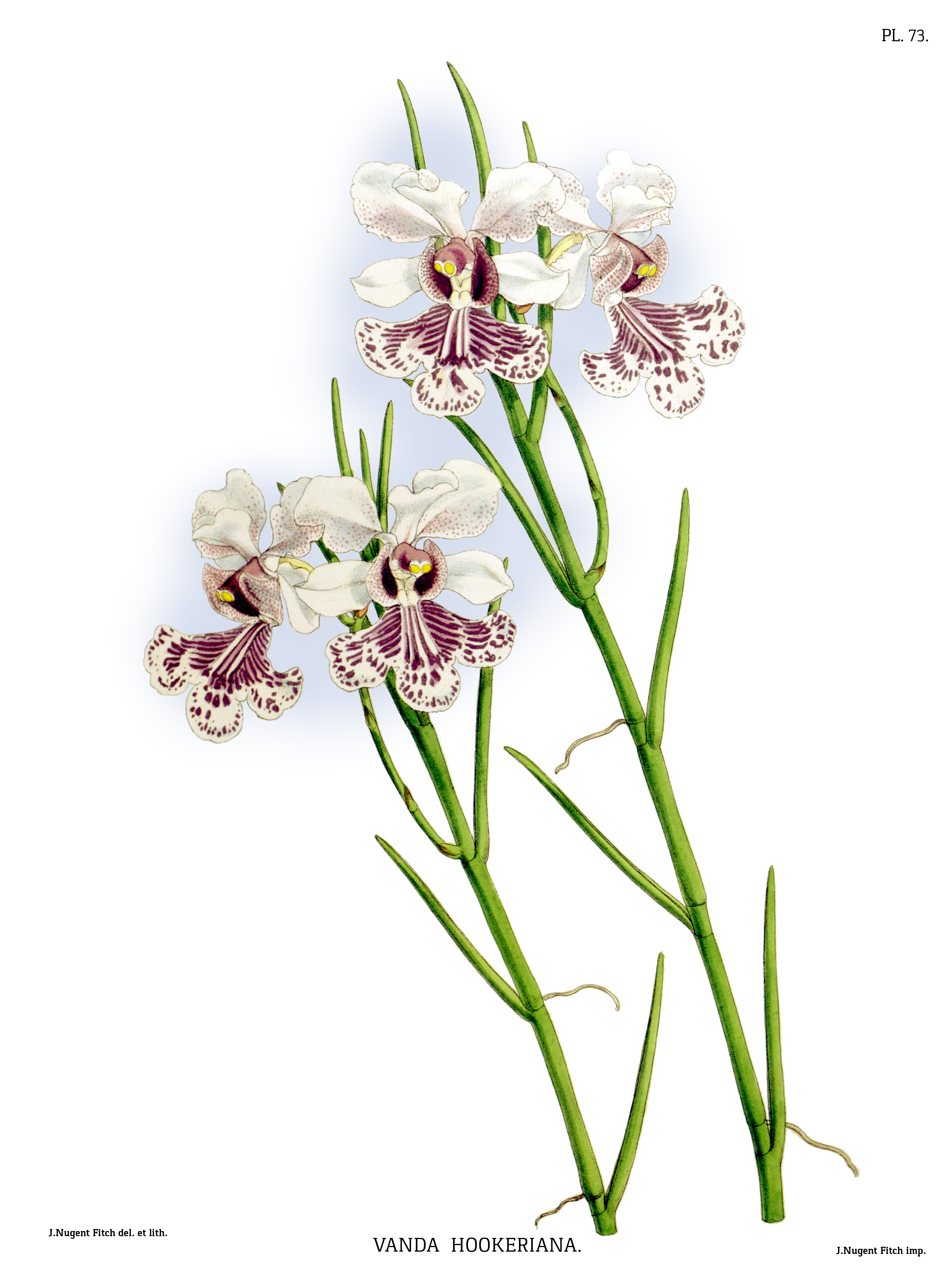
- Botanical illustration of Papilionanthe hookeriana as Vanda hookeriana by John Nugent Fitch
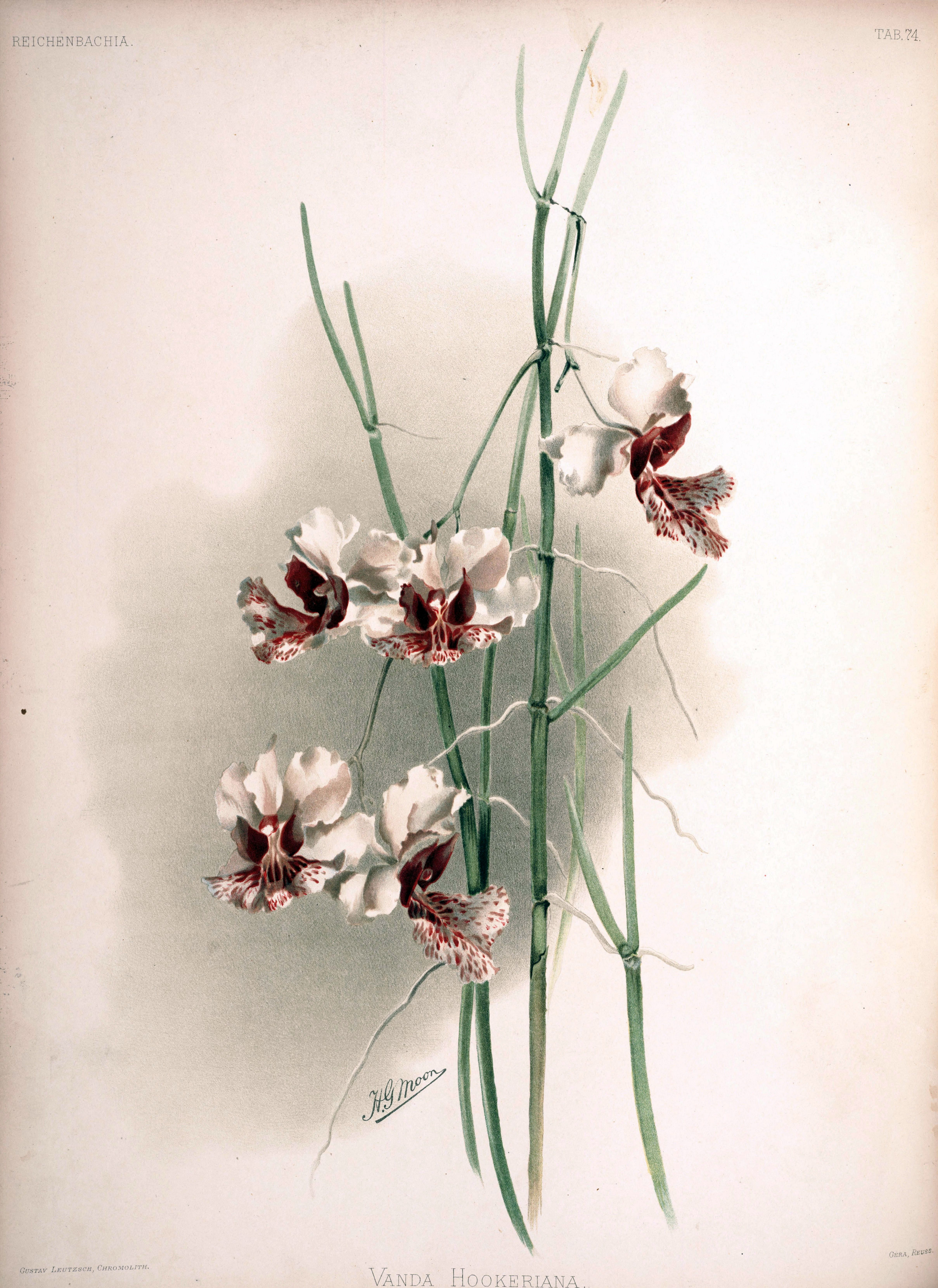
- Illustration by Frederick Sander, published 1888-1894

Scientific classification
- Kingdom: Plantae
- Clade: Tracheophytes
- Clade: Angiosperms
- Clade: Monocots
- Order: Asparagales
- Family: Orchidaceae
- Subfamily: Epidendroideae
- Genus: Papilionanthe
- Species: P. hookeriana

Binomial name
- Papilionanthe hookeriana (Rchb.f.) Schltr.

Synonyms
- Vanda hookeriana Rchb.f.; Vanda hookeri Anon.

= Papilionanthe hookeriana =

Species of orchid

Papilionanthe hookeriana, also known as anggrek pensil in indonesian, or kinta weed, is a species of orchid native to the swamps of Borneo, Malaya, Sumatera, Thailand, and Vietnam.

== Description ==
The peduncle of the inflorescence is longer than the leaves of the plant.

== Distribution ==
The species is native to Vietnam, Malaysia, Indonesia and Thailand.

== Habitat ==
This species is terrestrial or semi-aquatic, as opposed to many other orchid species that are epiphytic. It grows in full sun in swamps near sea level. The plants should be flooded during the growing season. These freshwater swamp forests may grow along the edges of lakes. The soil can be very acidic, with pH values ranging between 4 and 5.

== Conservation ==
These habitats are threatened from logging, fire and land conversion. Therefore, this species has been declining in Indonesia since the early 1990s. A program of the University of Riau made a restoration effort, re-planting artificially multiplied plants back into their intended habitat in 2007 and 2008. Further studies on micropropagation and acclimatisation of plantlets have been undertaken.

== Use in hybridisation ==
It is the pollen parent of the hybrid Papilionanthe Miss Joaquim, which was originally hybridised by Agnes Joaquim.
