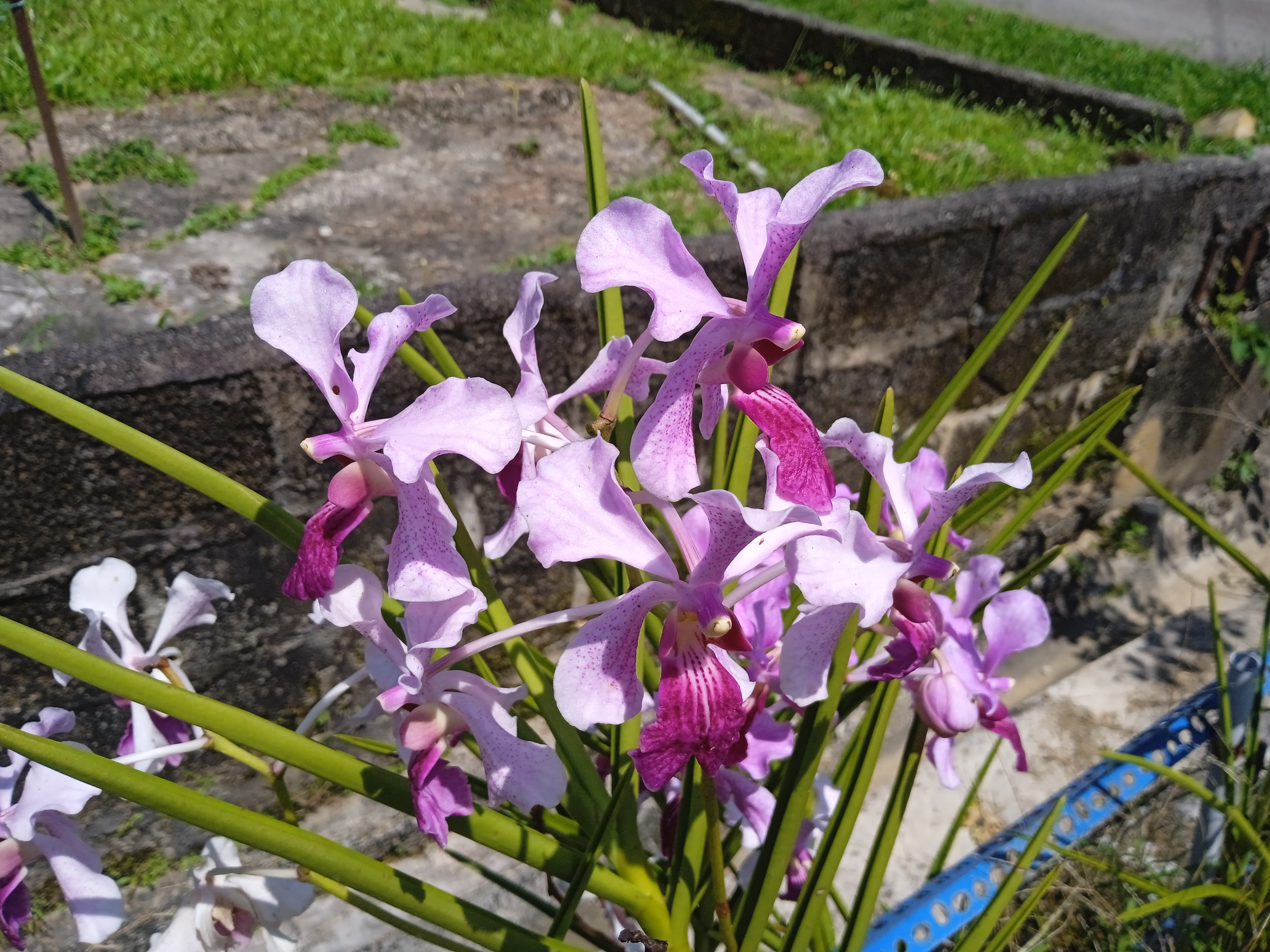
- Papilionanthe teres, Malaysia

Scientific classification
- Kingdom: Plantae
- Clade: Tracheophytes
- Clade: Angiosperms
- Clade: Monocots
- Order: Asparagales
- Family: Orchidaceae
- Subfamily: Epidendroideae
- Genus: Papilionanthe
- Species: P. teres

Binomial name
- Papilionanthe teres (Roxb.) Schltr.

Synonyms
- Dendrobium teres Roxb.; Papilionanthe teres f. candida (Rchb.f.) Christenson; Vanda teres (Roxb.) Lindl.; Vanda teres var. candida Rchb.f.

= Papilionanthe teres =

Species of plant

Papilionanthe teres, formerly Vanda teres and Ple. teres in the horticultural trade is an orchid species with many variations found in many parts of South-East Asia and is also found as north as Yunnan and in colder regions like the Himalayan foothills. The variety 'Andersonii' is the pod parent of Papilionanthe Miss Joaquim, the national flower of Singapore, the only country to have a hybrid as its national flower.

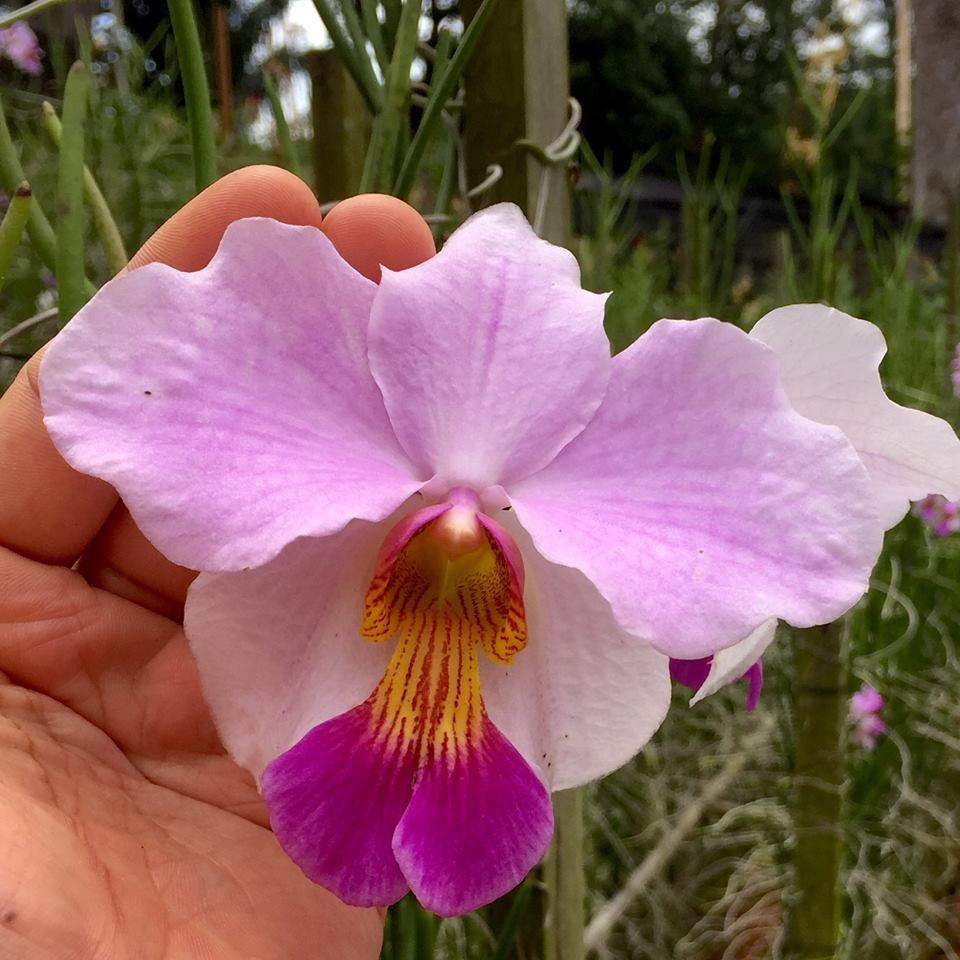
Papilionanthe teres var. 'Andersonii'
