= Papilionanthe biswasiana =

Scientific classification
- Kingdom: Plantae
- Clade: Tracheophytes
- Clade: Angiosperms
- Clade: Monocots
- Order: Asparagales
- Family: Orchidaceae
- Subfamily: Epidendroideae
- Genus: Papilionanthe
- Species: P. biswasiana

Binomial name
- Papilionanthe biswasiana (Ghose & Mukerjee) Garay

Synonyms
- Aerides biswasiana Ghose & Mukerjee

Species of epiphytic orchid

Papilionanthe biswasiana is a species of epiphytic orchid native to Laos, China, Myanmar, and Thailand. It is closely related to Papilionanthe vandarum.

== Description ==
It is erect or pendulous, slender, 50 cm (20 in) long, 13 to 16 mm (0.51 to 0.63 in) wide, usually unbranched stems with internodes of 3 to 4 cm (1.2 to 1.6 in) in length. It bears distichously arranged, terete leaves. They are 13 to 16 cm (5.1 to 6.3 in) long and 3 to 4 mm wide and fleshy. Stomata are presented on the entire leaf surface. Most stoma were brachyparacytic and laterocytic, but some were stephanocytic. The inflorescences, which usually do not exceed the length of the leaves, produce 1 to 3 widely opening, creamy white or slightly pink, large and thinly textured flowers in spring.

== Conservation ==
This species is included in the CITES appendix II.
