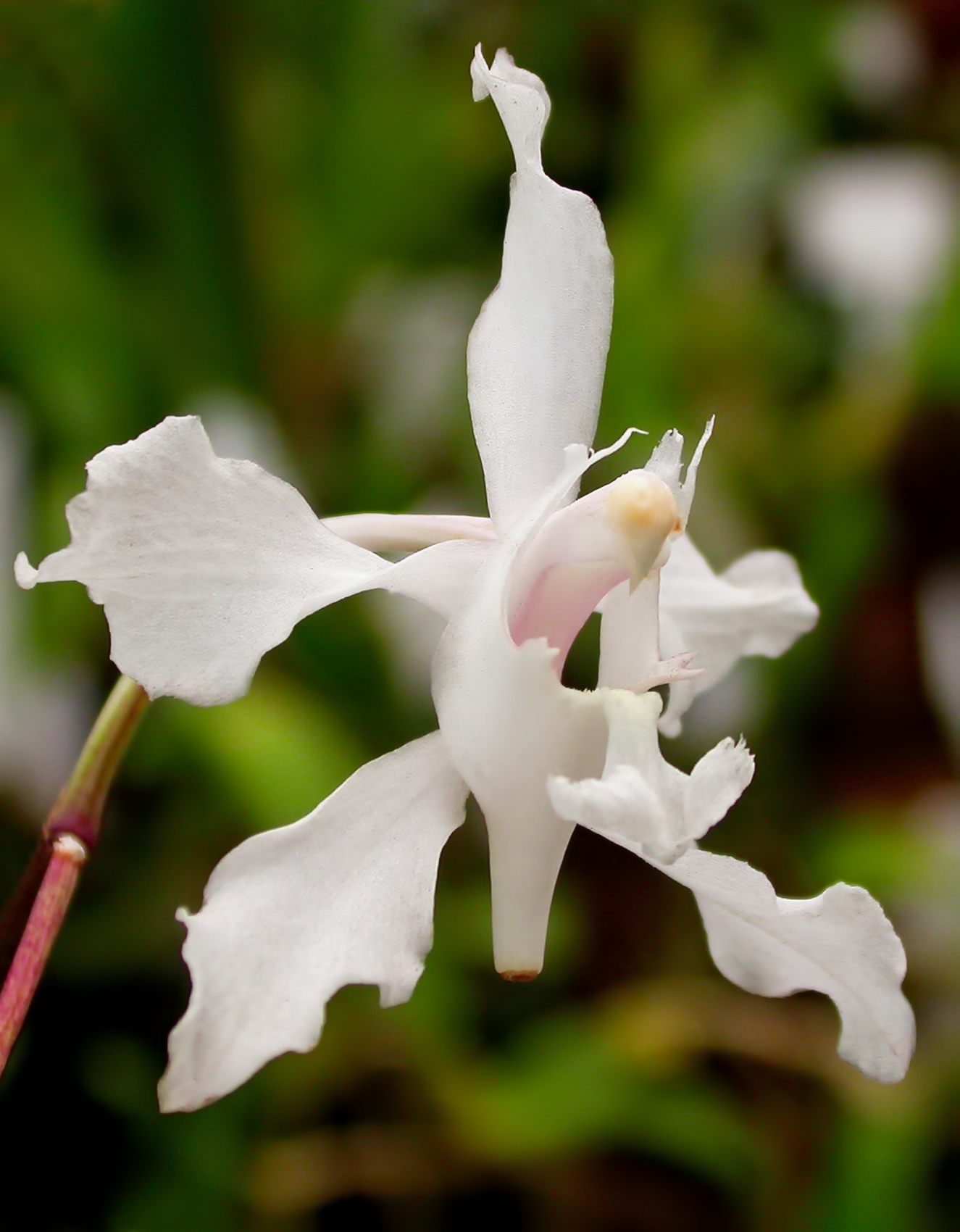
- Detail of Papilionanthe vandarum flower

Scientific classification
- Kingdom: Plantae
- Clade: Tracheophytes
- Clade: Angiosperms
- Clade: Monocots
- Order: Asparagales
- Family: Orchidaceae
- Subfamily: Epidendroideae
- Genus: Papilionanthe
- Species: P. vandarum

Binomial name
- Papilionanthe vandarum (Rchb.f.) Garay

Synonyms
- Aerides vandarum Rchb.f.; Vanda vandarum (Rchb.f.) K.Karas.; Aerides cylindrica Hook. nom. illeg.

= Papilionanthe vandarum =

Species of plant

Papilionanthe vandarum is a species of epiphytic orchid native to India, China, Myanmar, and Nepal. It is closely related to Papilionanthe biswasiana.

== Description ==
This species is adapted to drought and can grow in full sun. Flexible, long and slender stems bear terete, distichously arranged leaves with cuticular papillae and specialised, club-shaped water-storage cells are found within the mesophyll. The cuticle is very thick and may reach a thickness of 19 μm on the adaxial leaf surface and 17.5 μm on the abaxial leaf surface. Few flowers, resembling Vanda flowers, hence the specific epithet vandarum, are produced on axillary racemes. The floral morphology of the fragrant, predominantly white flowers infers entomophily and they are thought to be pollinated by moths. The three-lobed labellum bears a 1.6 cm long, slender, bent or curved spur, which has unicellular, or occasionally bicellular, secretory trichomes. Spindle-shaped, 0.3 mm long seeds with pointed ends are formed in capsules.

== Ecology ==
The plants may grow at altitudes of 1028 to 1740 m a.s.l. and flowering occurs in May to September or June to July.

== Conservation ==
This species is rare and endangered.

== Images ==
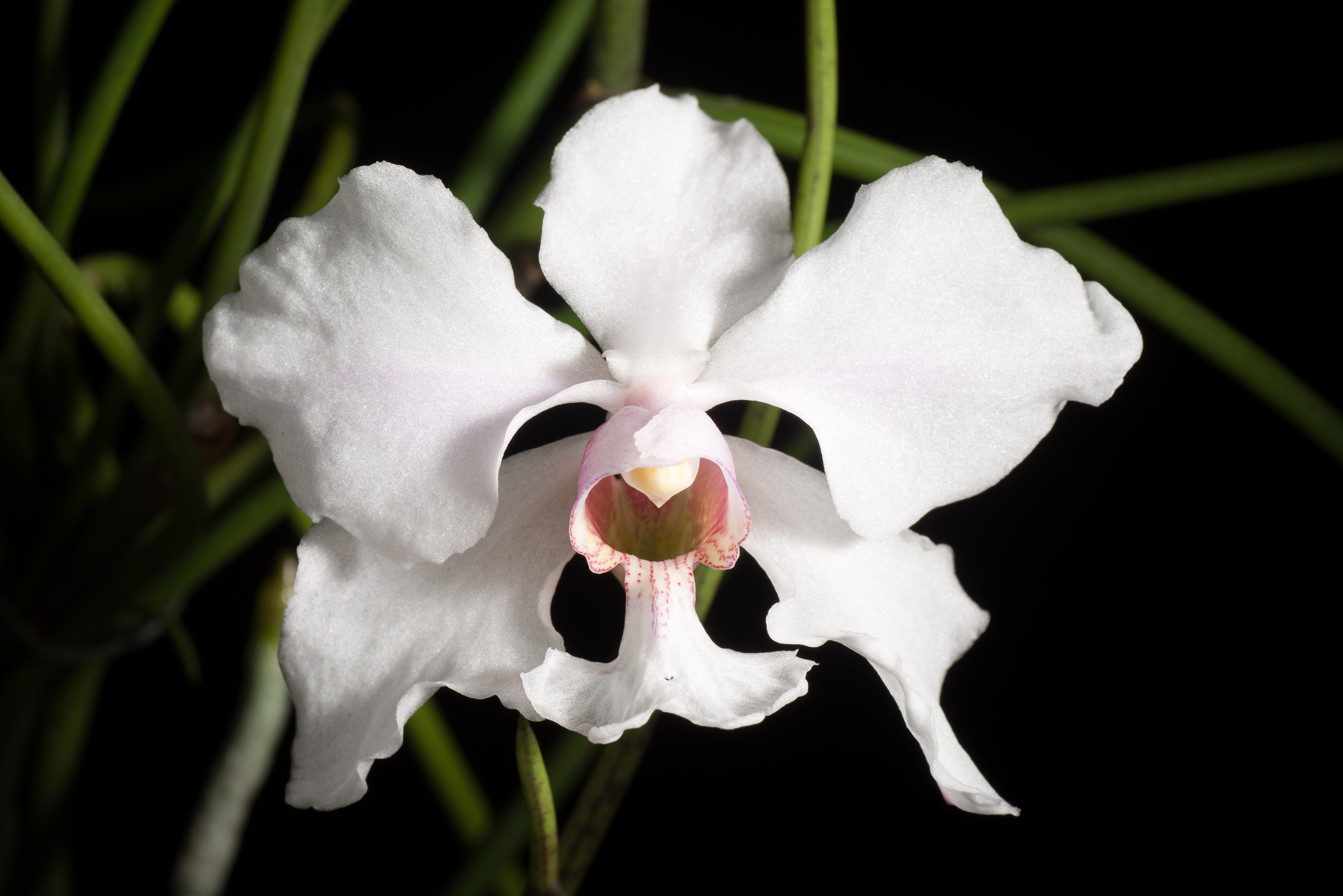

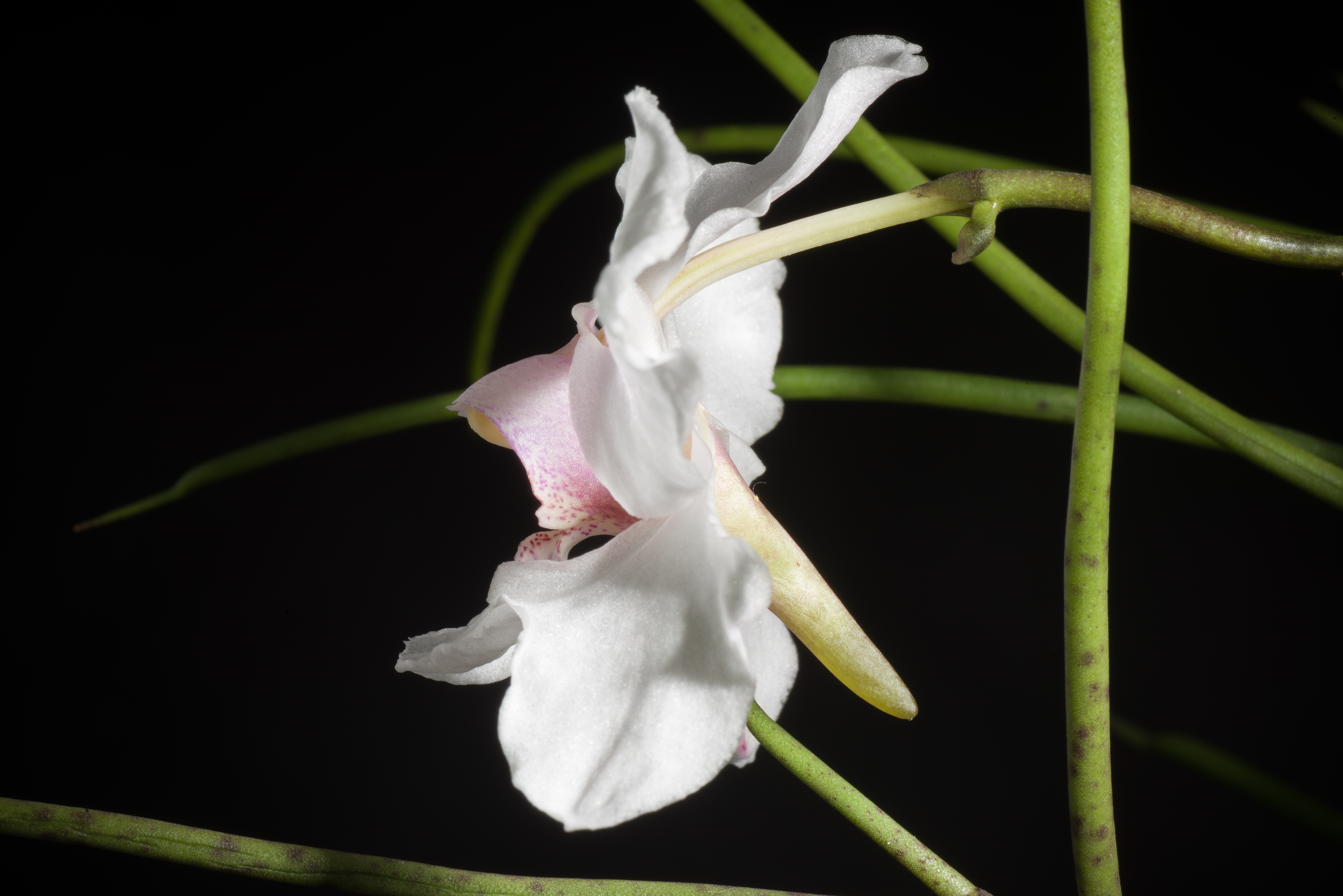

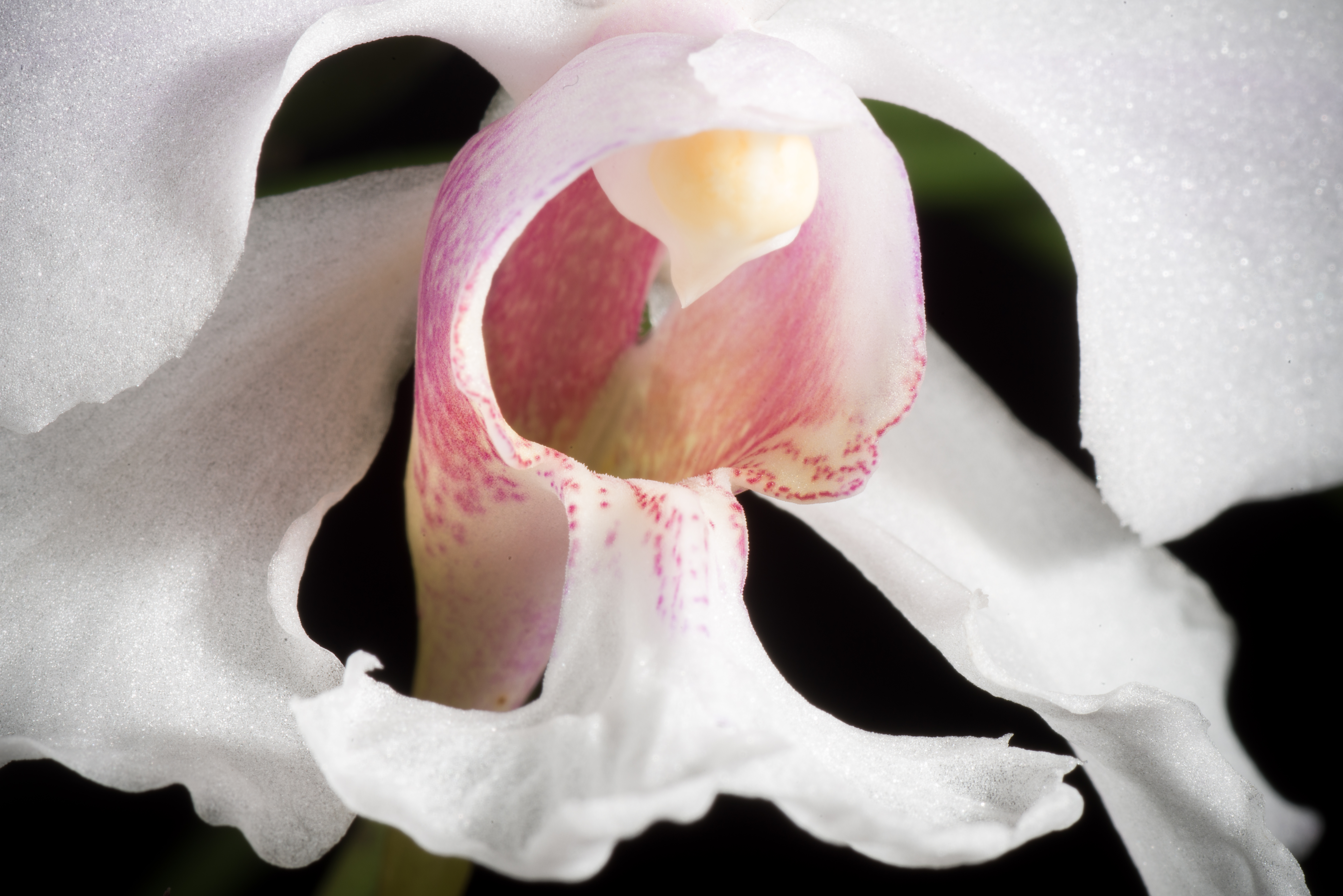

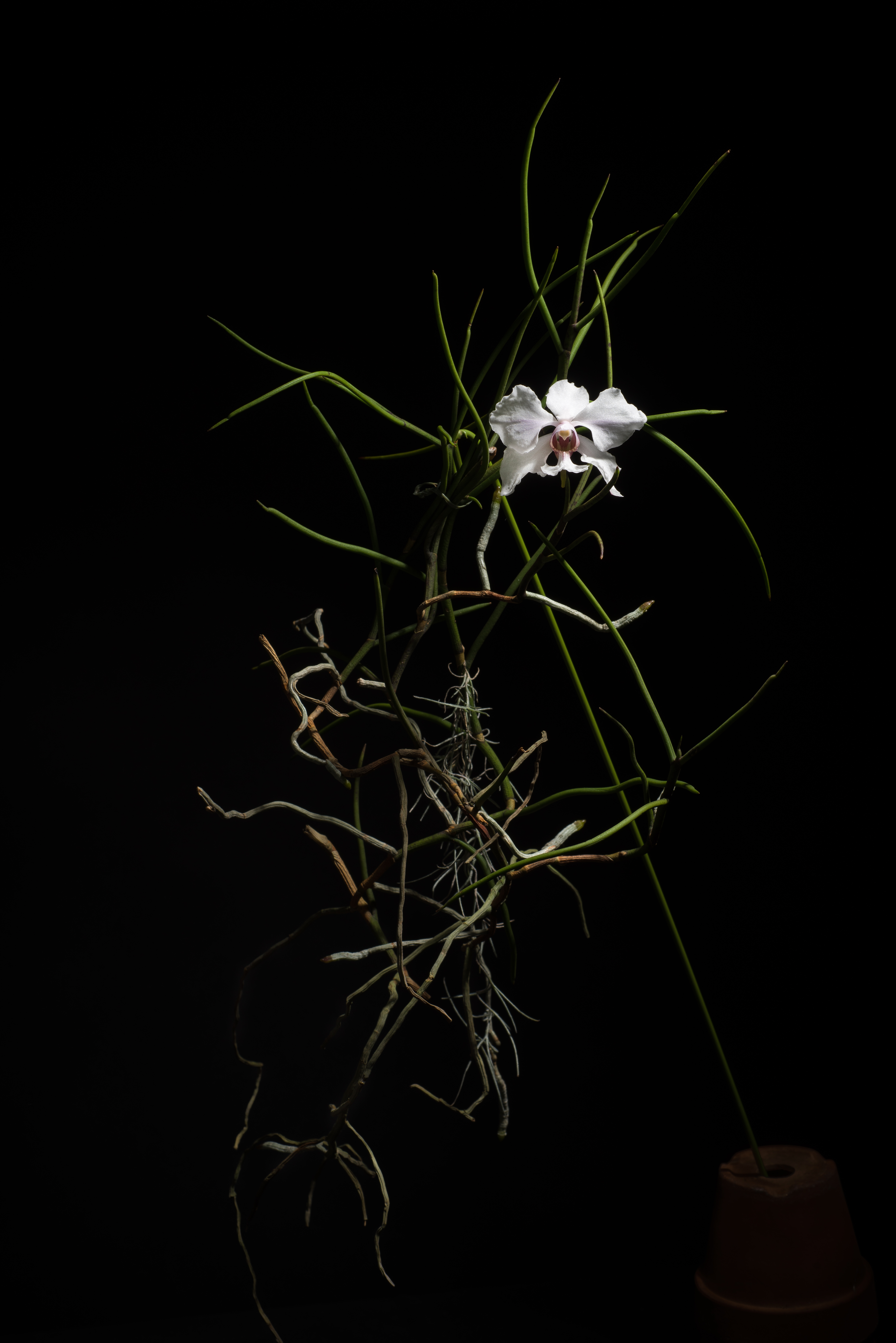

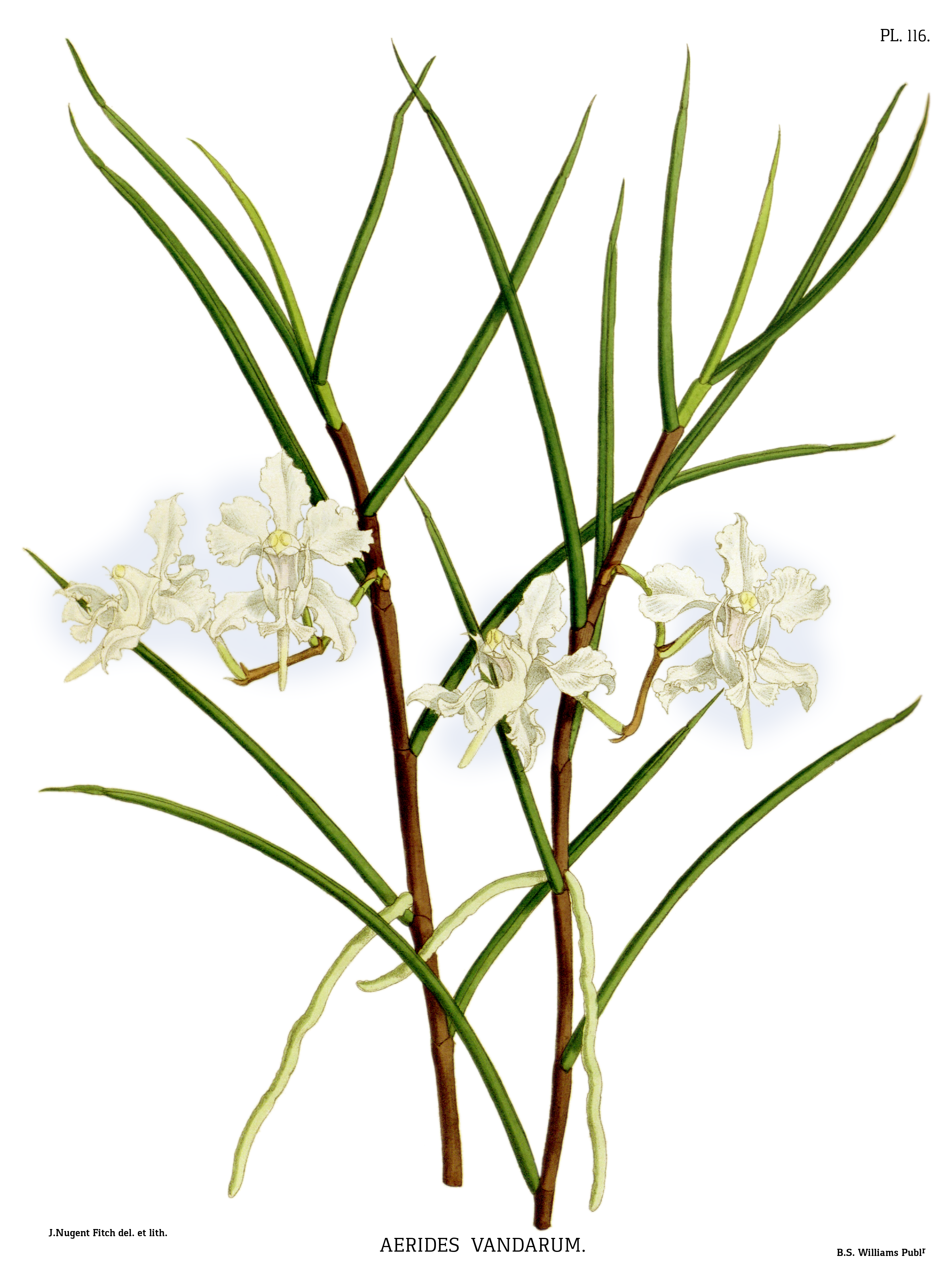
