= Cheri (given name) =

Cheri is a feminine given name inspired by the French chérie, meaning darling (from the past participle of the verb chérir, to cherish). It has also been used as a diminutive of names starting with or containing the sound Cher- or Sher- such as Cherilyn, Cheryl, Sharon, or Sherilyn for females. The name was well-used for girls in North America from the mid-1920s through the early 1990s and was at the height of popularity between the mid-1940s and mid-1970s. Spelling variants of the name such as Cherie, Cherry, Sharee, Shari, Sheree, Sherie, Sherrey, Sherri, Sherrie, and Sherry were in vogue during the same time period.

== Women ==
=== Given name ===
- Cheri Barry (1955–2023), American politician
- Cheri Ben-Iesau, American painter, muralist, author
- Cheri Blauwet (born 1980), American wheelchair racer
- Cheri Herman Daniels (born 1950), American civic leader
- Cheri Dennis (born 1979), American singer
- Cheri DiNovo (born 1950), Canadian United Church minister and social democratic politician
- Cheri Elliott (born 1970), old school American champion female bicycle motocross racer
- Cheri Gaulke (born 1954), contemporary artist
- Cheri Huber (born c. 1944), independent American Zen teacher
- Cheri Keaggy (born 1968), gospel singer and songwriter
- Cheri Maracle (born 1972), Indigenous Canadian actor and musician
- Cheri Register (1945–2018), American author and teacher
- Cheri Yecke, American politician
- Cheri Jo Bates (1948–1966), American murder victim of the Zodiac Killer

=== Nickname ===
- Cheryl “Cheri” Oteri (born 1962), American actress and comedian
