= Sheri (given name) =

- Pronunciation: Sheri
- Gender: Female

Origin
- Origin: French
- Meaning: "beloved"
- Region of origin: French

Other names
- Related names: Chari, Chéri, Cheri, Cherie, Cherri, Cherrie, Shari, Sherie, Sherri, Sherrie, Shery

Sheri is a female given name, from the French for beloved, and may refer to:

- Sheri Anderson, American TV writer
- Sheri Everts, American academic
- Sheri Forde, Canadian reporter
- Sheri Krams, American immunologist and academic administrator
- Sheri Graner Ray, video game specialist
- Sheri L. Dew (born c. 1954), Latter-day Saint leader
- Sheri Moon (born 1970), American actress
- Sheri Reynolds, author
- Sheri S. Tepper (1929–2016), American author
- Sheri Sam (born 1974), American professional basketball player

== See also ==
Alternative spellings include

- Chari (disambiguation)
- Cheri (disambiguation)
- Cherie
- Cherri (disambiguation)
- Cherrie
- Cherry (disambiguation)
- Shari (disambiguation)
- Sheree
- Sherie
- Sherri (disambiguation)
- Sherrie
- Sherry (disambiguation)
- Shery
