= Shari =

Shari may refer to:

- In South Asia, women's clothing also known as sari or saree
- In Buddhism, bead-shaped objects among the cremated ashes of Buddhist spiritual masters, also known as Śarīra

== Japanese culture ==
- Shari, deadwood on the main trunk of a bonsai tree
- Flavored rice used in making sushi

== Places ==
- Mount Shari, a quaternary stratovolcano
- Shari, Hokkaido, Japan
- Shari District, Hokkaido, Japan
- Shari River, a 949-kilometer-long river of central Africa
- Shari Mari, Anaqcheh Rural District, Ahvaz County, Khuzestan Province, Iran
- Ubangi-Shari, a French territory in central Africa which became the independent country of the Central African Republic in 1960
- Shari, Republic of Dagestan, a village in Dagestan

== People ==
=== Given name ===
- Shari (given name)
- Shari (actress), Indian film actress in Malayalam and Tamil films
- Shari Addison (born 1962), American gospel musician and artist
- Shari Arison (born 1957), American-born Israeli businesswoman and philanthropist
- Shari Belafonte (born 1954), American actress, model, writer and singer
- Shari Cantor (born 1959), American politician
- Shari Decter Hirst, Canadian politician
- Shari Elliker, American radio personality
- Shari Eubank (born 1947), American actress
- Shari Flanzer, 1992 World Series of Poker champion
- Shari Goldhagen, American author
- Shari Headley (born 1964), American film actress
- Shari Karney (born 1954), American attorney, incest-survivor activist, and bar exam review company owner
- Shari Koch (born 1993), German competitive ice dancer
- Shari Leibbrandt-Demmon (born 1966), Dutch curler
- Shari Lewis (1933–1998), Jewish American ventriloquist, puppeteer, and children's television show host
- Shari Mendelson (born 1961), American sculptor.
- Shari Olefson, American real estate attorney and author
- Shari Redstone (born 1954), American media executive
- Shari Rhodes (1938–2009), American casting director and producer
- Shari Robertson, American film Ddrector and producer
- Shari Roman, American film director, writer and artist
- Shari Sebbens (born 1985), Australian actress
- Shari Shattuck (born 1960), American actress and author
- Shari Sheeley (1940–2002), American songwriter
- Shari (singer) (born 2002), Italian singer
- Shari Springer Berman (born 1963), American filmmaker
- Shari Thurer, American psychologist
- Shari Trewin, computer scientist
- Shari Ulrich (born 1951), Canadian singer-songwriter
- Shari Villarosa (born 1951), United States diplomat and career foreign service officer

=== Surname ===
- Amirudin Shari (born 1980), Malaysian politician
- Said Ali Shari (1971–2013), Saudi Arabian deputy leader of the terrorist group Al-Qaeda

== Other uses ==
- Shari (album), a 1989 European release by Shari Belafonte
- Shari massacre, on 23–24 December 1997 near Tiaret, Algeria
- Shari Rothenberg, a character in the television series 24
- Shari Sawwing or black saw-wing (Psalidoprocne pristoptera), a bird in the swallow family
- Temple Shari Emeth, Manalapan, New Jersey, United States

== See also ==
- Chari (disambiguation)
- Chéri (disambiguation)
- Cheri (disambiguation)
- Cherie (disambiguation)
- Cherri (disambiguation)
- Cherrie, a surname or given name
- Cherry (disambiguation)
- Sheri (disambiguation)
- Sherie, a given name
- Sherri (name)
- Sherrie, a given name
- Sherry (disambiguation)
- Shery (born 1985), Guatemalan Latin pop singer and songwriter
