= Shari (given name) =

Shari is an English feminine given name inspired by the French chérie, meaning darling (from the past participle of the verb chérir, to cherish). It has also been used as a diminutive of names starting with or containing the sound Cher- or Sher- such as Cherilyn, Cheryl, Sharon, or Sherilyn for females. The name was well-used for girls in North America from the mid-1920s through the early 1990s and was at the height of popularity between the mid-1940s and mid-1970s. Spelling variants of the name such as Cherie, Cherry, Sharee, Sheree, Sherie, Sherrey, Sherri, Sherrie, and Sherry were in vogue during the same time period.

== People ==
=== Given name ===
- Shari (actress), Indian film actress in Malayalam and Tamil films
- Shari Addison (born 1962), American gospel musician and artist
- Shari Arison (born 1957), American-born Israeli businesswoman and philanthropist
- Shari Belafonte (born 1954), American actress, model, writer and singer
- Shari Cantor (born 1959), American politician
- Shari Decter Hirst, Canadian politician
- Shari Elliker, American radio personality
- Shari Eubank (born 1947), American actress
- Shari Flanzer, 1992 World Series of Poker champion
- Shari Goldhagen, American author
- Shari Headley (born 1964), American film actress
- Shari Karney (born 1954), American attorney, incest-survivor activist, and bar exam review company owner
- Shari Koch (born 1993), German competitive ice dancer
- Shari Lebreche, American politician
- Shari Leibbrandt-Demmon (born 1966), Dutch curler
- Shari Lewis (1933–1998), Jewish American ventriloquist, puppeteer, and children's television show host
- Shari Mendelson (born 1961), American sculptor.
- Shari Olefson, American real estate attorney and author
- Shari Redstone (born 1954), American media executive
- Shari Rhodes (1938–2009), American casting director and producer
- Shari Robertson, American film Ddrector and producer
- Shari Roman, American film director, writer and artist
- Shari Sebbens (born 1985), Australian actress
- Shari Shattuck (born 1960), American actress and author
- Shari Sheeley (1940–2002), American songwriter
- Shari (singer) (born 2002), Italian singer
- Shari Springer Berman (born 1963), American filmmaker
- Shari Thurer, American psychologist
- Shari Ulrich (born 1951), Canadian singer-songwriter
- Shari Villarosa (born 1951), United States diplomat and career foreign service officer
