= Sherry (name) =

Sherry is both a given name and surname derived from different sources. In some instances, the name was inspired by the wine. In others, it was likely inspired by the French chérie, meaning darling (from the past participle of the verb chérir, to cherish). It has also been used as a diminutive of names starting with or containing the sound Cher- or Sher- such as Sherrod or Sherwood for males or Cheryl, Sharon, or Sherilyn for females. In some instances, the given name was used as a transferred use of the surname. The name was well-used for girls in North America from the mid-1920s through the early 1990s and was at the height of popularity between 1946 and 1975. Spelling variants of the name such as Cheri, Cherie, Cherry, Shari, Sheree, Sherie, Sherrey, Sherri, and Sherrie were in vogue during the same time period.

People with the name include:

== Given name ==
=== Women ===
- Sherry Anderson (born 1964), Canadian curler
- Sherry Appleton (1942–2023), American politician from Washington state
- Sherry Berecz, American politician
- Sherry Boschert, American author, journalist, and activist
- Sherry Calvert (born 1951), American javelin thrower
- Sherry Chen (politician) (born 1955), South African politician
- Sherry Chen (actress) (born 1983), Hong Kong actress
- Sherry Chen (hydrologist), American scientist falsely accused of spying for China
- Sherry Chou, Canadian neurologist
- Sherry Gay-Dagnogo (born 1967), American politician from Michigan
- Sherry Gambin-Walsh, Canadian politician
- Sherry Glaser (born 1960), American actress, performance artist, and political activist
- Sherry Grace (born c. 1954), American activist, founder of Mothers of Incarcerated Sons
- Sherry Harbin, American academic
- Sherry Hawco (1964–1991), Canadian artistic gymnast
- Sherry Jackson (born 1942), American actress and child star
- Sherry Kean (fl. 1980s), Canadian pop and country singer
- Sherry Lansing (born 1944), American actress and film studio executive
- Sherry Lawrence (born 1984), Canadian alpine skier
- Sherry Lynn (born 1952), American voice actress
- Sherry Middaugh (born 1966), Canadian curler
- Sherry Miller (born 1955), Canadian actress
- Sherry Ortner (born 1941), American cultural anthropologist
- Sherry Rich, Australian alternative country singer-songwriter and guitarist
- Sherry Romanado (born 1974), Canadian politician
- Sherry Ross (born c. 1954), American ice hockey broadcaster and journalist
- Sherry Simon, Canadian translation scholar
- Sherry Stringfield (born 1967), American television actress
- Sherry Sylvester, American political worker and journalist
- Sherry Thomas (born 1975), American novelist
- Sherry Tsai (born 1983), Hong Kong swimmer
- Sherry Turkle (born 1948), American professor of the Social Studies of Science and Technology
- Sherry Wilson, Canadian politician from New Brunswick
- Sherry Wolf (born 1949), American photorealist painter and fashion designer

=== Women nicknamed Sherry ===
- Sharyn “Sherry” Alberoni (born 1946), American actress and voice artist

=== Men ===
- Sherry Edmundson Fry (1879–1966), American sculptor
- Sherry Khattak, Member group of Karakoram
- Sherry Malik (born 1960), Pakistani actor, director, and screenwriter
- Sherry Mangan (1904–1961), American writer, journalist, translator, editor, and book designer
- Sherry Ross (pioneer) (1824–1867), American pioneer

=== Men nicknamed Sherry ===
- Sherwood "Sherry" Bassin (born 1939), Canadian ice hockey executive
- Sherwood "Sherry" Boehlert (1936–2021), American politician
- Sherwood “Sherry” Magee (1884–1929), American baseball left fielder
- Sherman "Sherry" Peticolas (1904–1956), American sculptor and art teacher
- Sherrard “Sherry” Robertson (1919–1970), Canadian-American baseball outfielder and second baseman
- F. Sherwood "Sherry" Rowland (1927–2012), American professor
- Walter Sherborne "Sherry" Shourds (1906–1991), American director and manager
- Sherrod “Sherry” Smith (1891–1949), American baseball pitcher
- Sherwood "Sherry" Washburn (1911–2000), American physical anthropologist

== Surname ==
- Andy Sherry (born 1943), British karate practitioner
- David Sherry (philosopher), American philosopher
- David Sherry (artist) (born 1974), artist from Northern Ireland
- David Benjamin Sherry (born 1981), American photographer
- Fionnuala Sherry (born 1962), Irish violinist and vocalist
- Fred Sherry (born 1948), American cellist
- Fred Sherry (baseball) (1889–1975), American baseball pitcher
- Gerry Sherry (fl. 1926), American football player
- J. Barney Sherry (1874–1944), American actor of the silent film era
- Jack Sherry (fl. 1952–1954), American football and basketball player
- James Sherry (born 1967), Australian television presenter and actor
- Janice Sherry (born 1960), Canadian politician
- Larry Sherry (1935–2006), American baseball pitcher
- Louis Sherry (1855–1926), American restaurateur, caterer, confectioner and hotelier
- Matt Sherry (born 1984), American football tight end
- Mike Sherry (born 1988), Irish rugby union player
- Nick Sherry (born 1955), Australian politician
- Norm Sherry (1931–2021), American catcher, manager, and coach in Major League Baseball
- Norman Sherry (1925–2016), English born American novelist, biographer, and educator
- Ray Sherry (1924–1989), Australian politician from Sydney
- Suzanna Sherry, American professor in the area of constitutional law
- Sylvia Sherry (born 1932), English writer
- Tom Sherry (1881–1971), Australian rules footballer
- William Grant Sherry (1914–2003), American painter and artist

== See also ==
- Sherry (disambiguation)
