= Chari =

Chari may refer to:

== Places ==
- Chari River, in Central Africa
- Chari-Baguirmi (disambiguation), in Chad
- Chari Department, in Chad, one of three departments making up the region of Chari-Baguirmi
- Moyen-Chari (disambiguation), in Chad
- Chari, Iran, a village in Kerman Province, Iran
- Chari, North Khorasan, a village in North Khorasan Province, Iran
- Chari Kshetra, four holy regions in Odisha, India

== Other uses ==
- Chari (surname)
- Chari Jazz, a Chadian band
- Ch'ari, a letter in the Georgian alphabet

== See also ==
- Cheri (disambiguation)
- Cherie (disambiguation)
- Cherri (disambiguation)
- Cherrie, a surname or given name
- Cherry (disambiguation)
- Shari (disambiguation)
- Sheri (disambiguation)
- Sherie, a given name
- Sherri (name)
- Sherrie, a given name
- Sherry (disambiguation)
- Shery (born 1985), Guatemalan Latin pop singer and songwriter
