= Sharee =

Name list

Sharee is a feminine given name likely inspired by the French chérie, meaning darling (from the past participle of the verb chérir, to cherish) It has also been used as a diminutive of names starting with or containing the sound Cher- or Sher- such as Cheryl, Cherilyn, Sharon, or Sherilyn for females. The name was well-used for girls in North America from the mid-1920s through the early 1990s and was at the height of popularity between the mid-1940s and mid-1970s. Spelling variants of the name such as Cherie, Cherry, Shari, Sheree, Sherie, Sherrey, Sherri, Sherrie, and Sherry were in vogue during the same time period.

It may refer to:

- Sharee Miller (born 1971), American murderer
- Sharee Ann Tan (born 1982), Filipina politician
