= Cheri =

Cheri or Chéri may refer to:

== People ==
=== Given name ===
- Cheri (given name)
- Cheri Ben-Iesau, American painter, muralist, author
- Cheri Blauwet (born 1980), American wheelchair racer
- Cheri Dennis (born 1979), American singer
- Cheri DiNovo (born 1950), Canadian United Church minister and social democratic politician
- Cheri Elliott (born 1970), old school American champion female bicycle motocross racer
- Cheri Gaulke (born 1954), contemporary artist
- Cheri Huber (born c. 1944), independent American Zen teacher
- Cheri Keaggy (born 1968), gospel singer and songwriter
- Cheri Maracle (born 1972), Indigenous Canadian actor and musician
- Cheri Oteri (born 1962), American actress and comedian
- Cheri Register (1945–2018), American author and teacher
- Cheri Yecke, American politician
- Cheri Jo Bates (1948–1966), American murder victim of the Zodiac Killer

== Places ==
- Cheri, Iran, a village in North Khorasan Province, Iran
- Cheri, Niger, a town in Niger
- Cheri Monastery, Bhutan

== Other uses ==
- Chéri (band), a Canadian female dance music duo
- Chéri (novel), a 1920 novel by French author Colette
- Chéri (1950 film), a film based on the novel
- Chéri (2009 film), a film based on the novel
- Chéri+, a Japanese magazine
- Chéri, an older French-language term for sharia law used during the time of the Ottoman Empire, from the Turkish şer’(i)
- Capability Hardware Enhanced RISC Instructions, a computer architecture research project

== See also ==
- Chari (disambiguation)
- Cherie (disambiguation)
- Cherri (disambiguation)
- Cherrie, a surname or given name
- Cherry (disambiguation)
- Chieri (disambiguation)
- Shari (disambiguation)
- Sheri (disambiguation)
- Sherie, a given name
- Sherri (name)
- Sherrie, a given name
- Sherry (disambiguation)
- Shery (born 1985), Guatemalan Latin pop singer and songwriter
