= Cherie =

Cherie is an English female given name. It comes from the French chérie, meaning darling (from the past participle of the verb chérir, to cherish). It has also been used as a diminutive of names starting with or containing the sound Cher- or Sher- such as Cherilyn, Cheryl, Sharon, or Sherilyn for females. The name was well-used for girls in North America from the mid-1920s through the early 1990s and was at the height of popularity between the mid-1940s and mid-1970s. Spelling variants of the name such as Cherry, Sharee, Shari, Sheree, Sherie, Sherrey, Sherri, Sherrie, and Sherry were in vogue during the same time period.

Notable people with the name or stage name include:

- Cherie, one of the stage names of French singer Cyndi Almouzni (born 1984)
- Cherie Bambury (born 1976), Australian cricket player
- Cherie Bennett (born 1960), American novelist, actress, director, playwright, newspaper columnist, singer and television writer
- Cherie Berry (born 1946), American politician from North Carolina
- Cherie Blair (born 1954), known professionally as Cherie Booth, British barrister, wife of former prime minister Tony Blair
- Cherie Buckner-Webb (born 1951), American politician from Idaho
- Cherie Burton (born 1968), Australian politician
- Cherie Chung (born 1960), Hong Kong film actress
- Cherie Currie (born 1959), American musician, singer, songwriter, actress and artist
- Cherie de Boer (born 1950), accordionist, half of the Dutch duo Accordéon Mélancolique
- Cherie DeCastro (1922–2010), one of The DeCastro Sisters, a female singing trio
- Cherie Dimaline (born 1975), Canadian Métis writer
- Cherie Ditcham (born 1981), Australian actress and model
- Cherie Gallagher (born 1982), Australian basketball player
- Cherie Gardiner (born 1991), 2009 Miss Northern Ireland
- Cherie Gil (born 1963), Filipino actress
- Cherie Johnson (born 1975), American film and television actress
- Cherie Kagan (born 1969), American professor in nanotechnology
- Cherie Kluesing (died 1989), American landscape architect, designer, and educator
- Cherie Lunghi (born 1952), English film, television and theatre actress
- Cherie Mercado, Filipina broadcast journalist
- Cherie Nowlan, Australian film and television director
- Cherie Piper (born 1981), Canadian ice hockey player
- Cherie Priest (born 1975), American novelist and blogger
- Cherie Roberts (born 1978), American model and photographer
- Cherie Templer (1856–1915), New Zealand painter
- Cherie Wilkerson, American writer
- Cherie Witter (born 1963), American model and Playboy Playmate

== See also ==
- Chérie Carter-Scott
- Cherie Amie, American retailer
- Chéri (disambiguation) (includes Cheri)
- Sherri (name)
