= Sherri (name) =

Sherri is a feminine given name likely inspired by the French chérie, meaning darling (from the past participle of the verb chérir, to cherish) an English version of the French term of endearment chérie and also associated with the wine sherry. It has also been used as a diminutive of names starting with or containing the sound Cher- or Sher- such as Cheryl, Sharon, Sheryl, or Sherilyn for females. The name was well-used for girls in North America from the mid-1920s through the early 1990s and was at the height of popularity between the mid-1940s and mid-1970s. Spelling variants of the name such as Cheri, Cherie, Cherry, Sharee, Shari, Sheree, Sherie, Sherrey, Sherrie, and Sherry were in vogue during the same time period.

The name may refer to:

- Sherri Baier, former Canadian pairs figure skater
- Sherri Coale (born 1965), current women's basketball coach for the University of Oklahoma Sooners
- Sherri DuPree (born 1983), vocalist, guitarist and lyricist for the band Eisley
- Sherri Field (born 1972), former field hockey player
- Sherri Finkbine (born 1942), American television actress
- Sherri Gallick, American politician from Missouri
- Sherri Howard (born 1962), former American athlete
- Sherri Jarvis (1966–1980), American murder victim
- Sherri Mandel, American journalist and literary professor
- Sherri Martel (1958–2007), American professional wrestler and valet
- Sherri Rasmussen (1957–1986), American murder victim
- Sherri Reinfurt, American politician
- Sherri Saum (born 1974), American Daytime Emmy nominated actress
- Sherri Shepherd (born 1967), American comedian and actress
- Sherri Singler (born 1974), Canadian curler
- Sherri Smith (disambiguation)
- Sherri Steinhauer (born 1962), American golfer
- Sherri Stoner (born 1965), American actress and writer
- Sherri Sylvester (born 1959), longtime entertainment reporter
- Sherri Turner (born 1956), American golfer
- Sherri Winston, American writer
- Sherri Youngward, Christian praise and worship artist

== Fictional characters ==
- Sherri and Terri fictional characters in The Simpsons

== See also ==
- Chari (disambiguation)
- Cheri (disambiguation)
- Cherie
- Cherri (disambiguation)
- Cherrie
- Cherry (disambiguation)
- Shari (disambiguation)
- Sheri
- Sherie
- Sherrie
- Sherry (disambiguation)
- Shery
