= Sherri =

Sherri may refer to:

- Sherri (name)
- Sherri (2009 TV series), an American sitcom starring Sherri Shepherd
- Sherri (talk show), a syndicated daytime show hosted by Sherri Shepherd that premiered in 2022

== See also ==
- Shari (disambiguation)
- Sheri
- Sherie
- Sherrie
- Sherry (disambiguation)
- Shery
