= Cherie (disambiguation) =

Cherie is a feminine given name.

Chérie or Cherie may also refer to:

- Cherie, a stage name of Cyndi Almouzni (born 1984), French singer
- Cherie (album), Cherie's debut album
- Chérie Carter-Scott (born 1949), author
- Chérie FM, a French radio station
- Chérie (film), a 1930 American-French musical comedy film
- the title character of Petra Chérie, an Italian comic series

== See also ==
- Agustina Cherri (born 1983), Argentine actress known as Cherri
- Sherie Rene Scott (born 1967), American actress known as Sherie
- Shery (born 1975), Guatemalan singer
- Chari (disambiguation)
- Chéri (disambiguation)
- Cheri (disambiguation)
- Chery (disambiguation)
- Cherrie (disambiguation)
- Cherry (disambiguation)
- Shari (disambiguation)
- Sherrie (disambiguation)
- Sherry (disambiguation)
