= Cherrie =

Other names
- Variant forms: Chari, Chéri, Cheri, Cherie, Cherri, Cherry, Shari, Sheri, Sherie, Sherri, Sherrie, Sherry, Shery

Cherrie is both a surname and a given name. Notable people with the name include:

- George Kruck Cherrie (1865–1948), American naturalist and explorer
- Peter Cherrie (born 1983), Scottish football goalkeeper
- Cherrie Ying (born 1983), actress
- Cherrie (singer) (born 1991), Swedish R&B singer
- Cherrie Ann Crichlow-Cockburn, Trinidad and Tobago politician

== See also ==
- Cherrie, Michigan, a ghost town
