= Sheree =

Sheree is an English female given name. It might come from the French chérie, meaning darling (from the past participle of the verb chérir, to cherish). It has also been used as a diminutive of names starting with or containing the sound Cher- or Sher- such as Cheryl, Cherilyn, Sharon, or Sherilyn for females. The name was well-used for girls in North America from the mid-1920s through the early 1990s and was at the height of popularity between the mid-1940s and mid-1970s. Spelling variants of the name such as Cherie, Cherry, Shari, Sherie, Sherrey, Sherri, Sherrie, and Sherry were in vogue during the same time period.

It may refer to:

- Sheree Bautista, Filipino singer, actress, dancer, model
- Sheree Bradford-Lea, Canadian freelance cartoonist and mixed-media artist
- Sheree Fitch (born 1956), Canadian children's author
- Sheree Harris (born 1959), New Zealand cricketer
- Sheree Gray (born 1985), American soccer defender
- Sheree Jeacocke (born 1958), Canadian singer/songwriter
- Sheree Murphy (born 1975), English actress and television presenter
- Sheree North (1932–2005), American actress, singer, and dancer
- Sheree-Lee Olson (born 1954), Canadian novelist, poet and journalist
- Sheree Thomas, writer, book editor and publisher
- Shereé Whitfield (born 1970), American television personality, cast member of The Real Housewives of Atlanta
- Sheree J. Wilson (born 1958), American actress
- Sheree Wingard (born 1988), Australian netball player
- Sheree Winton (1935–1976), English actress
- Sheree Zampino (born 1967), American actress and television personality, cast member of Hollywood Exes and The Real Housewives of Beverly Hills
- Sheree, a character on the Nick Jr. cartoon Julius Jr.

== See also ==
- Cherie
- Sherrey
- Sherrie
- Shree 420
