= Dalijan (disambiguation) =

Dalijan is a city in Markazi Province, Iran.

Dalijan or Deliijan (Persian: داليجان), also rendered as Dalenjan, may refer to:

- Delijan, Lahijan, Gilan Province
- Delijan, Masal, Gilan Province
- Delijan, Rudsar, Gilan Province
- Dalijan-e Kordha, North Khorasan Province, Iran
- Dalijan-e Torkiyeh, North Khorasan Province, Iran
- Dalijan, Semnan

== See also ==
- Dilijan (Armenian: Դիլիջան), is a spa town and urban municipal community in the Tavush Province of Armenia.
