= Rashvanlu =

Rashvanlu (Persian: رشوانلو) may refer to:

- Rashvanlu, Bojnord
- Rashvanlu, Faruj
- Rashvanlu, Shirvan
