= Sangli, Iran =

Sangli (Persian: سنگلي) may refer to:

- Sangli-ye Shirin
- Sangli-ye Shur
