= Krams =

Krams is a surname. Notable people with the surname include:

- Arthur Krams (1912–1985), American set designer
- Sheri Krams, (fl. 1989–)American immunologist and academic administrator
