= Yaish =

Yaish is both a given name and a surname. Notable people with the name include:

- Yaish Ibn Yahya (c.1120 or 1130–1196), Portuguese scholar and politician
- Adly Yaish, Palestinian politician
- Sharon Yaish, Israeli director and editor
