= Sherry (disambiguation) =

Sherry is a type of wine.

Sherry may also refer to:

== Arts and entertainment ==
- Sherry (1920 film), an American drama directed by Edgar Lewis
- "Sherry" (song), a 1962 song written by Bob Gaudio and performed by The Four Seasons
- Sherry!, a 1967 musical by Laurence Rosenthal and James Lipton
- The Sherrys, a 1960s American girl group
- "Oh Sherrie", a song by Steve Perry on the 1984 album Street Talk
- Sherry Birkin, one of the main protagonists in the game Resident Evil 2, besides Claire Redfield
- Sherry Palmer, a character on the television series 24
- Sherry (The Walking Dead), a character in The Walking Dead

== Other uses ==
- Sherry (name), a list of people with the given name or surname
- Sherry, Wisconsin, a town and unincorporated community
- Sherry's, a defunct restaurant in New York City

== See also ==
- Chari (disambiguation)
- Chéri (disambiguation)
- Cheri (disambiguation)
- Cherie (disambiguation)
- Cherrie, a given name and surname
- Cherry (disambiguation)
- Shari (disambiguation)
- Sheri (disambiguation)
- Sherie, a given name
- Sherri (disambiguation)
- Sherrie, a given name
- Shery (born 1985), Guatemalan Latin pop singer and songwriter
