= Wein Bar =

Nightclub in Cincinnati, US, 1934–1980

Coordinates: 39°07′59.6″N 84°29′16.6″W

The Wein Bar, located in Cincinnati, Ohio was established in 1934 as a Black and Tan club and is one of the longest known operating establishments that catered to the Black community, its musicians, and in active support of their civil rights. The bar was closed in 1980 after more than 45 years of operation.

== Operation ==
The proprietor, Joseph Goldhagen, was a Jewish immigrant from Vyzhnytsia a town in present-day Ukraine. During the 1920s, Joseph was active in the commercial production of illegal alcohol, and once the Prohibition period ended, the bar was opened.

From the founding of the bar, Joseph supported the black community by frequently hosting events, food drives, and providing social support. The original bar had several locations (500 West 4th street, and 413 west 6th street, others), and opened the primary location at 2985 Gilbert Ave after it became difficult to serve the mostly Black customers at the original locations due to discrimination-based zoning laws.

Later, the bar was operated by the extended Goldhagen family, and starting in the 1950s, the bar was primarily managed by Abraham K. Goldhagen (1904–1992). The first of eight children, Abraham was born in Manhattan, New York, and lived most of his adult life in Cincinnati, Ohio while operating the establishment.

== Civil rights and activism ==
The Gilbert Ave bar was located in an historically Black neighborhood, and became the primary operation for most of the bar's existence. The immediate neighborhood is culturally significant as the location of an early public debate about slavery at Lane Seminary, and directly across the street from the bar was the former home of abolitionist, Harriet Beecher Stowe. During the time period of the Wein bar's operations, the Stowe home was designated as a Green Book hotel (Edgemont Inn) and used by Black travelers to find safe housing and other accommodations.

During Abraham's management, the bar was the frequent NAACP meeting place used to organize regional civil rights protests and trips to the Jim Crow south in support African American causes. Alongside fellow activists Julian Bond, Maurice McCracken, Marian Spencer, Fred Shuttlesworth, Ted Berry and others, Abraham used the bar as a nexus for the civil rights movement. Activists, politicians, clergy, and others planned their activities and, notably the plans to make the march to Selma to Montgomery, March on Washington, and many other civil rights events.

Using the bar to manage these civil right activities, Abraham was recognized with various awards including:

- MLK Freedom Bell Award
- Ohio Governors Service Award
- NAACP Roy Wilkins Man of the Year Award

== Music venue ==
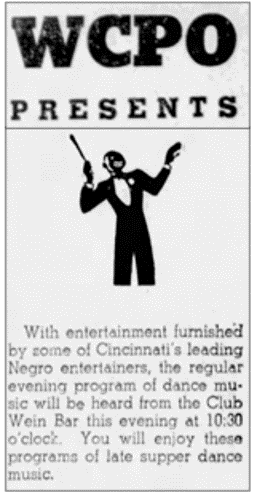
WCPO Live Radio Advertisement (1938)

Early radio broadcasts with live performances of Black artist were a regularly scheduled occurrence, and the bar had multiple live performances daily. Over time, the bar evolved into an R&B live performance venue with regional and national music entertainment.

Known performers who visited or played at the bar include Fats Waller, Lionel Hampton, Lou Rawls, James Brown, and notably the formation of the James Brown funk era band (The J.B.'s) occurred during a live NAACP fundraising performance at the bar.

== See also ==
- Samuel Goldhagen
- Daniel Goldhagen
