= Samuel M. Goldhagen =

American Army Air Corps officer (1918–1945)

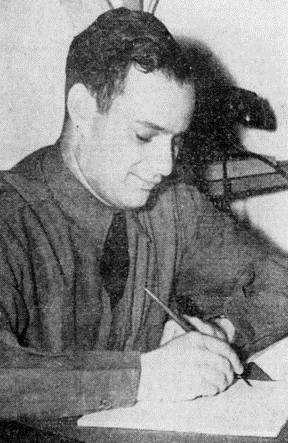
Samuel Using President Roosevelt's Draft Extension Pen

Samuel Milton Goldhagen (January 6, 1918 – April 12, 1945) was an American Army Air Corps Jewish, American commissioned officer who served during World War II in the Pacific and European theaters. He initially enlisted on June 9, 1941, and from his barracks, wrote a letter to President Franklin Roosevelt, imploring him to appreciate the need to defeat Nazism, and to extend the service term of the enlisted soldiers. A return letter was sent from the White House, which included the actual pen used by President Roosevelt to sign the extension of the American draft in preparation for the war effort. Goldhagen's service included hosting a military support dinner with Hollywood film stars of the day, was present at Pearl Harbor during the attack, and as B-24 Bombardier, became a German POW, and ultimately died from his injuries that occurred during his final mission over Munich, Germany.

== Letter to president ==
Preceding the events at Pearl Harbor, the Roosevelt administration lobbied Congress to approve an amendment to extend the term of the active enlisted duty to 18 months. However the nation, and many members of Congress, did not support the extension terms, including Theodore Roosevelt’s daughter Alice Longworth, aviation hero Eddie Rickenbacker, and other Hollywood stars of the day. During this period, the White House received an average of 3,000 letters per day. Goldhagen expressed his support directly by sending a letter to the President requesting to receive the pen that FDR would use to sign the resolution

The extension was approved on August 12, 1941, by just one vote in the house. A response letter from the White House was written by Edwin Pa Watson, Roosevelt's close personal friend and military adviser stating: 'In accordance with your wish, I have much pleasure in sending you the Pen used by the President on August 18 in signing the joint resolution to extend the period of service of those in the military.'

== Hollywood stars support ==
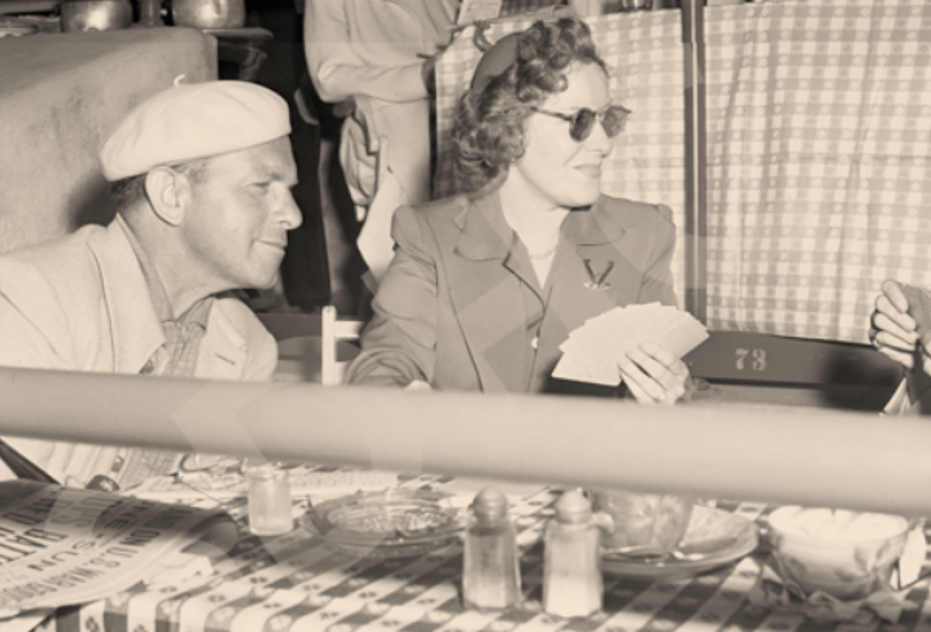
George Burns and Gracie Allen – Del Mar Racetrack 1941

While at the Del Mar Turf Club, in San Diego, CA, Goldhagen met Hollywood film stars George Burns, Gracie Allen, and others and invited them to a dinner at Camp Callan barracks to further support the war effort. The invitation was accepted and also attended by Salley Eilers, and Pat O'Brien. The gathering received national newspaper coverage and served to highlight the connection between Washington's growing war preparations, and the support of many enlisted soldiers, even though politically, there were debates about the extended draft and the growing involvement in another European conflict.

== World War II service ==
- Present at Pearl Harbor during the Japanese attack.
- Bombardier in the 15th Air Force, (stationed in Spinazzola, Italy), the 460th Bomber Group (the Black Panthers)
- Fighter air support from the Tuskegee Airmen during raids into Axis occupied territory
- Final mission (38th) on July 19, 1944, while over Munich targeting BMW engine plant, his B-24 was hit by flak, and Samuel was captured by German forces
- POW at Stalag Luft 3 Sagan-Silesia Bavaria (Moved to Nuremberg-Langwasser)

== Commendations ==
- World War II Victory Medal
- Purple Heart
- American Campaign Medal
- Army Presidential Unit Citation
- Air medal Award

== Death and burial ==
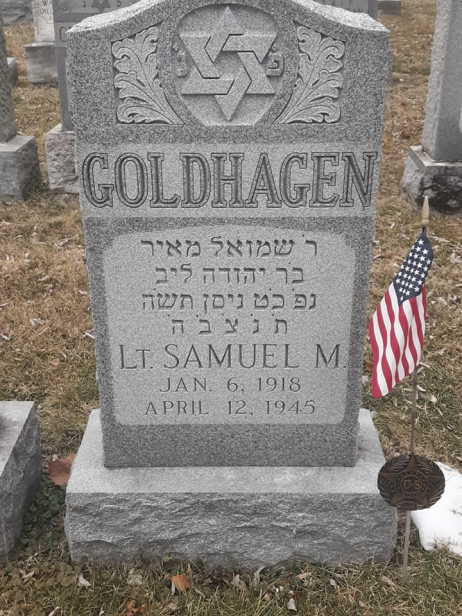
Covedale Cemetery, Cincinnati, Ohio

During captivity, Goldhagen was transferred from Stalag Luft 3, to a prison hospital near Munich for treatment of leg injuries suffered during the downing of his B-24 over Munich on July 14, 1944. During this time, the camp was under the command of Friedrich Wilhelm von Lindeiner-Wildau, who was known for his compliance with the Geneva convention rules which included the required proper and decent care for the wounded. However, once Goldhagen was moved to a nearby hospital for care, according to USAF incident reports, his wounds were not treated at the hospital due to his "H" dog tag ("Hebrew" designation). His death may have occurred after being transferred back to the prison camp where the POWs were marched to other POW camps to evade the approaching US and Russian forces (Goldhagen's death date coincides with the date the American prisoners at XIII-D were marched to Stalag VII-A). Goldhagen is buried in Cincinnati, Ohio at the Jewish Covedale Cemetery, Hamilton County, Ohio, USA.

== Personal life ==
Samuel's parents were Ukrainian Jews (Joseph and Beki Goldhagen) from the town of Vyzhnytsia, Ukraine (formerly Wischnitz, Austria-Hungary), who immigrated to New York City circa 1900, and later moved to Cincinnati, Ohio. The Goldhagen family operated a bar and music venue (The Wein Bar) which was a long time operating establishment in support of social and political causes, including the civil rights and fair treatment of the African American community.

== See also ==
- Daniel Goldhagen
- Shari Goldhagen
- National Museum of American Jewish Military History
- History of the Jews during World War II
