= A Whore Like Me =

2019 film

- זונה כמוני
- Directed by: Yael Shachar, Sharon Yaish
- Written by: Yael Shachar, Sharon Yaish
- Starring: Csilla Ezra
- Cinematography: Yael Shachar
- Edited by: Sharon Yaish
- Production company: Daroma Productions
- Release date: May 2019
- Running time: 60 minutes
- Country: Israel
- Language: Hebrew

A Whore Like Me is an Israeli film written and directed by Sharon Yaish and Yael Shachar.

== Plot ==
At age 22, Csilla is abducted from a pub in Hungary, and sold to a prostitution ring in Israel. After escaping from her kidnappers, she learns the Hebrew language and volunteers in a humanitarian shelter, and is celebrating 10 years of sobriety. However, when Israel's Ministry of Interior does not believe that she was trafficked and will not give her a certificate of residency, she hires a private investigator and returns to her kidnappers to obtain proof. She searches for anyone who witnessed her trauma, determined not to allow her existence to be erased once again. However, she is unsure what the effect of returning to the hell from which she escaped will be.

== Production ==
The film was produced by Hagai Arad, Elad Peleg and Daroma Productions; it was released with the support of Yes Doco, the New Fund for Film and Television and the National Council for Culture and the Arts.

The idea for the A Whore Like Me came to life when Yaish and Shachar were documenting some community theater in Tel Aviv, conducted by survivors of prostitution. They didn't know what direction their work would take, until Csilla came on stage and told her story. The filmmakers were so impressed with her forthrightness, her unique story, and her ability to reflect upon the ups and downs of her life, and decided to accompany her on her search for her abductors. They describe the journey as riddled with disappointment and danger, alongside hope and determination.

== Responses ==
On June 2, 2019, Zehava Galon wrote a Facebook post addressing Interior Minister Aryeh Deri, urging him to recognize Csilla as a victim of trafficking in women and to cancel her deportation.

On July 24, 2019, a crowdfunding campaign was launched to finance Csilla's legal expenses in her quest to obtain an Israeli identity card.

== Critical response ==
Oron Shamir, in Srita, wrote a favorable review of A Whore Like Me, calling Csilla "a once-in-a-lifetime cinematic character", and that her telling of her experiences struck him deeply, even offered second-hand, as they were. In her Haaretz review, Shani Littman calls A Whore Like Me "one of the most important [films] ever made about prostitution, exhorting that "all men must see this movie". She further writes that the film is "sharp, poignant and piercing chronicling of the experience of a prostituted woman, detailing how she is on the extreme end of a spectrum that includes many, and perhaps all, women.

== Awards ==
Year	Award	Category	Result
2019	Ophir (Israeli Film Academy)	Best Documentary under 60 minutes	Won
2019	The Israeli Documentary Film Awards	Best Documentary under 60 minutes	Won
2019	Docaviv	Best Israeli Film	Nominated
