= Faruj Rural District =

Rural district in North Khorasan province, Iran

Faruj Rural District Persian: دهستان فاروج
- Rural District
- Location within Iran
- Coordinates: 37°08′N 58°05′E
- Country: Iran
- Province: North Khorasan
- County: Faruj
- District: Central
- Established: 1987
- Capital: Cheri

Population (2016)
  - Total: 6,963
- Time zone: UTC+3:30 (IRST)

Faruj Rural District (Persian: دهستان فاروج) is in the Central District of Faruj County, North Khorasan province, Iran. Its capital is the village of Cheri.

== Demographics ==
=== Population ===
At the time of the 2006 National Census, the rural district's population was 7,488 in 1,947 households. There were 7,246 inhabitants in 2,125 households at the following census of 2011. The 2016 census measured the population of the rural district as 6,963 in 2,226 households. The most populous of its 32 villages was Cheri, with 2,087 people.

=== Other villages in the rural district ===
- Dalenjan-e Kordiyeh
- Dalenjan-e Torkiyeh
- Kalateh-ye Mohammad Reza Khan
- Kavaki
- Mafranqah
- Rashvanlu
- Rizeh
- Rostamabad
- Sangli-ye Shirin
- Sangli-ye Shur
