= Adimadhyantham =

- Film promotional poster
- Directed by: Sherrey
- Screenplay by: Sherrey
- Produced by: P. Rasheed
- Starring: Prajith; Sajitha Madathil; Mamukkoya
- Cinematography: Jaleel Badusha
- Edited by: Saleesh
- Music by: Saji Ram
- Release date: 13 December 2011 (IFFK)
- Running time: 104 minutes
- Country: India
- Language: Malayalam

Adimadhyantham (meaning: The Beginning, The Middle and The End) is a 2011 Malayalam film written and directed by debutant Sherrey and produced by P. Rasheed, starring Prajith and Sajitha Madathil in the lead roles. Adimadhyantham won a special mention award at the 59th National Film Awards. The film is yet to get a theatrical release, but received generally positive reviews in its premiere show. It was the only Malayalam film selected to compete in the 16th International Film Festival of Kerala, but was later ousted on technical grounds, and after a huge scandal, was included for a non-competition screening.

== Plot ==
Adimadhyantham tells the story of a deaf Vedan boy from northern Kerala named Ekalavyan, who has to follow and perform some traditional tribal rituals to carry forward his family tradition in Theyyam and traditional beliefs. The boy is speech-and hearing-impaired, and his fears about death and loneliness form the main thread of its story. The boy experiences days and nights differently and has nightmares about death.

== The IFFK controversy ==
The Adimadhyantham-IFFK controversy started off from the fact that the film was initially co-edited by an IFFK official Beena Paul Venugopal. Later the editing work was handed over to another person, for obscure reasons, and the film did not credit Beena Paul Venugopal as a co-editor either. What originated as a credit claim, later led to the expulsion of Adimadhyantham from the list of films in the competition section of the International Film Festival of Kerala, of which Beena Paul Venugopal is a managing official. This amounted to an unexpectedly huge scandal because Adimadhyantham was the only Malayalam film selected to the competition section of the 16th IFFK. The expulsion was through the direct intervention of Priyadarshan, chairman of the Chalachithra Academy, and the rejection was defended publicly by K. B. Ganesh Kumar, Minister for Cultural Affairs. This raised a controversy and K. B. Ganesh Kumar, the Minister for Cultural Affairs, claimed that the film was rejected because, only a rough-cut version was submitted. He produced a DVD in the press conference to prove his argument, while the selection committee maintained that a finished film was, in fact, submitted to the committee and that they had seen the complete film before selecting it. This flared up the controversy and the matter was pulled to the High Court of Kerala. The court rejected the plea on technical grounds (lack of English subtitles during submission of the film, a rule never strictly followed in the preceding years). An appeal moved to the Division Bench was also rejected on the same grounds leaving an IFFK without a Malayalam film to compete. Later, upon flaring up of the scandal, K. B. Ganesh Kumar conceded to include the film in the non-competing category, limited to just two screenings. The left oriented cultural organization Purogamana Kala Sahitya Sangham took the issue up and waged a protest at one of the IFFK venues. The issue came up in the open forum discussion on the second day of the festival, and the delegates engaged in heated arguments with Priyadarshan. In the end, Priyadarshan apologised for the problems. After the protests, Adimadhyantham was screened in the festival under "Malayalam Cinema today" section on 13 December 2011. Prior to that, the film was premiered on 4 December 2011.

== Accolades ==
- 59th National Film Awards - Special mention Award.
- 14th John Abraham Award for Best Malayalam Film (by Federation of Film Societies of India).
- Kerala State Film Award for Best Debut Director: Sherrey
- Kerala State Film Award – Special Mention: Prajith- Child Actor
