= Shattered Trust: The Shari Karney Story =

1993 American television film

- DVD cover
- Genre: Drama
- Written by: Susan Nanus
- Directed by: Bill Corcoran
- Starring: Melissa Gilbert; Kate Nelligan
- Music by: Micky Erbe; Maribeth Solomon
- Country of origin: United States
- Original language: English

Production
- Executive producers: Michael Jaffe; Janet Faust Krusi
- Producer: John Danylkiw
- Cinematography: Frank Tidy
- Editor: Gordon McClellan
- Running time: 94 minutes
- Production companies: Michael Jaffe Films; Heartstar Productions

Original release
- Network: NBC
- Release: September 27, 1993

Shattered Trust: The Shari Karney Story is a 1993 American made-for-television drama film directed by Bill Corcoran. The film, which is based upon the true story of Shari Karney, garnered generally positive reviews.

== Plot ==
Situated in 1982, Shari Karney is a successful attorney, assigned to an incest case, involving a three-year-old girl, Christie, who is being molested by her father. She initially refuses to take the case, explaining that she isn't familiar with cases involving sexual abuse. She is later convinced by the child's mother, Darlene Holland, but the trial proves to be difficult. Nine months later, she is heavily invested in the case, which involves her private life. She has trouble sleeping at night and is often bothered by flashbacks of her own past. Whenever she tries to make love with her boyfriend Mark, she suffers panic attacks.

She eventually attacks David Holland, the man charged, in the courtroom and is therefore sent to jail for two days. Shari fears she has ruined the case, but Darlene insists on holding her as her lawyer. The judge, however, puts her on probation and forces her to seek psychological help. She contacts psychiatrist Joan Delvecchio and admits to her that she is constantly hearing typing sounds. She reveals that as a child she was physically abused by her mother, and that her father had done nothing to protect her.

Her sister Linda thinks therapy would be good for her, explaining that there must be a reason that she never wore make-up and always wore baggy clothes. At court, David is prohibited from seeing his daughter for six months. Shari is furious that thereafter, he is allowed to see her again, claiming that he then will keep on raping her. Meanwhile, in therapy, Joan notices that Shari shows the same symptoms as rape victims, but thinks it could be explained by her father's abuse. When Mark finds out she has taken another incest case, he leaves her.

She turns to her parents, but her mother blames her for having driven Mark away. Her therapist makes her write a letter to her mother. When writing, not only does she express the hatred she feels for her mother, but also reveals that she is an incest victim herself, having been abused by her father for years. She starts to remember everything and finds out that she buried the abuse so deep that she didn't consciously remember it.

In sessions, Joan helps her remember the entire truth and eventually Shari tells that her father raped her after typing, which explains the sounds of typing she heard. She confronts her parents, but they respond with outrage, claiming they will never forgive her for the accusation. Linda refuses to believe her as well and has trouble even accepting the possibility. At work, her new client withdraws and Christie is hospitalized. Frustrated, she is determined to change the law, allowing incest victims to sue their parents whenever they want to, without a statute of limitations.

She contacts Stephanie Chadford, another lawyer who tried to change the incest law. This requires her to step to the media, telling her own story. She is immediately estranged from her sister and disowned by her parents. Meanwhile, the process of changing a law proves to be exhausting, taking up to six years to even qualify in court, and her emotional involvement upsets her partners, who eventually fire her. In the end, however, the law changes, with Shari's help.

== Cast ==
- Melissa Gilbert as Shari Karney
- Kate Nelligan as Stephanie Chadford
- Shirley Douglas as Vivian Karney
- Dick Latessa as Jack Karney
- Rosemary Dunsmore as Rose Beckman
- Stewart Bick as Mark
- Ellen Burstyn as Joan Delvecchio
- Kenneth Welsh as Judge Norton
- Patricia Kalember as Linda Karney
- Kirsten Kieferle as Darlene Holland

== Production ==
Parts of the film were shot in Salt Lake City, Utah.
