= Rostamabad, North Khorasan =

Village in North Khorasan province, Iran

Rostamabad Persian: رستم اباد
- Village
- Location within Iran
- Coordinates: 37°12′36″N 58°08′39″E
- Country: Iran
- Province: North Khorasan
- County: Faruj
- District: Central
- Rural District: Faruj

Population (2016)
  - Total: 481
- Time zone: UTC+3:30 (IRST)

Rostamabad (Persian: رستم اباد) (Note: Also romanized as Rostamābād) is a village in Faruj Rural District of the Central District in Faruj County, North Khorasan province, Iran.

== Demographics ==
=== Population ===
At the time of the 2006 National Census, the village's population was 429 in 118 households. The following census in 2011 counted 458 people in 142 households. The 2016 census measured the population of the village as 481 people in 154 households.
