= Kalateh-ye Mohammad Reza Khan =

Village in North Khorasan province, Iran

Kalateh-ye Mohammad Reza Khan Persian: كلاته محمدرضاخان
- Village
- Location within Iran
- Coordinates: 37°12′48″N 58°09′12″E
- Country: Iran
- Province: North Khorasan
- County: Faruj
- District: Central
- Rural District: Faruj

Population (2016)
  - Total: 402
- Time zone: UTC+3:30 (IRST)

Kalateh-ye Mohammad Reza Khan (Persian: كلاته محمدرضاخان) (Note: Also romanized as Kalāteh-ye Moḩammad Reẕā Khān; also known as Moḩammad Reẕā Khān) is a village in Faruj Rural District of the Central District in Faruj County, North Khorasan province, Iran.

== Demographics ==
=== Population ===
At the time of the 2006 National Census, the village's population was 349 in 80 households. The following census in 2011 counted 366 people in 102 households. The 2016 census measured the population of the village as 402 people in 112 households.
