= Cherie Amie =

U.S.- based lingerie retailer

- Company type: Limited Liability Company
- Industry: Apparel
- Founded: Irving, Texas, United States (August 15, 2011)
- Headquarters: Flower Mound, Texas US
- Area served: United States
- Key people: Ryan Schuette; Tara Smith
- Products: baby dolls, boxers, garters, panties, teddies, accessories
- Website: cherieamie.com
- Footnotes / references Entity name: Peace Tree Africa Partnership, LLC

Cherie Amie is a U.S.-based retailer of ethical lingerie with production and operations in Cameroon, Central Africa. It is the first fair trade intimate apparel company to adopt the Good Returns business model and use 100 percent of its net profits to fund microloans. Styling itself as a "do-good" lingerie producer, the company also finances sustainable development projects in sub-Saharan Africa by contributing 10 percent of its net income to Peace Tree Africa, a 501(c)3 tax-exempt nonprofit organization.

The company was founded in 2011 by a Returned Peace Corps Volunteer and Rotary Ambassadorial Scholar with similar experiences in Africa. It made headlines in 2012 when it successfully raised $15,250 with a 45-day Indiegogo campaign, only to survive a house and office fire more than two months later.

Cherie Amie opened its online retail store on Human Rights Day, December 10, 2012.

== Founding ==
University of North Texas alumni Ryan Schuette and Tara Smith first came upon the idea for fair-trade lingerie after a discussion about their frustrations over a lack of ethically made intimate apparel in the United States. The two had founded their own separate nonprofits to further development projects in sub-Saharan Africa and wanted to launch a business capable of connecting apparel made by women overseas to U.S. markets.

A scandal involving child labor on a fair trade-certified farm contracted with Victoria's Secret reportedly helped Schuette and Smith cement their commitment to fair trade principles in December 2012.

== Good Returns ==
A conversation with Salah Boukadoum, co-owner of Soap Hope and founder of Good Returns, persuaded Schuette and Smith to adopt his business model for Cherie Amie in 2012. Under Good Returns, member companies invest all of their dividends as interest-free loans to social enterprises in order to help scale sustainable solutions to pressing world problems. Some member companies may choose to invest only their investor payouts, while others pledge to finance microloans with 100 percent of their net profits. With nearly 100 percent of borrowers repaying their loans by year-end, Good Returns companies receive their contributed funds after a year in service.

Cherie Amie became the fourth company to participate in the Good Returns movement and the second to fund micro-loans with 100 percent of its net profits in 2012.

== Indiegogo campaign ==
Schuette and Smith incorporated the company under Peace Tree Africa Partnership, LLC, in August 2011, with plans to raise $15,000 in start-up capital from a crowd-funding campaign by August the following year. Securing assistance from Carole Hayes, a Dallas-based boudoir photographer, the two recruited three initial models whom they came to call The Fair Ladies and recorded a 37-second teaser video that served as the face of their campaign.

The two launched their Indiegogo campaign in July 2012 and successfully raised the funds by late August. Ninety-four backers ultimately joined the effort, helping the campaign exceed its goal. Smith departed for Cameroon shortly afterward to oversee a team of artisans and apparel production in October 2012.

== 2012 fire ==
A fire unexpectedly gutted the older house and office in use by Schuette and Smith early in the morning on November 7, 2012. The incident occurred roughly four hours after Smith had returned from her six-week production trip to Cameroon. The Returned Peace Corps Volunteer escaped with minor burns, rescuing her dog and more than half of the apparel in the process. Irving, Texas-based authorities ruled the fire an accident.

The event made national headlines and forced the company to postpone its Black Friday launch until Human Rights Day. The founders made light of their situation by notably releasing humorous pictures of themselves and their house on Cherie Amie's Facebook and Twitter accounts.

== Criticism ==
The Fair Ladies of Cherie Amie.

Several prominent news bloggers criticize Cherie Amie for undermining a message about poverty with a controversial marketing strategy. Writing for Osocio, a nonprofit advertising weblog, Tom Megginson highlighted the "provocative" nature of the teaser video that Cherie Amie uploaded in July 2012, adding that "one can't help but wonder if this kind of western objectification is the best way to support the empowerment of women in the developing world." Kate Leaver, a critic for The Daily Life, an Australian news blog, slammed the company for "casually linking Western excess and sexuality to African poverty," so that "[r]ather than encouraging women to empathise or understand or directly support African women, it reduces their role to a single transaction: panties for social change."

Other blogs and trade publications, including Adrants, The Lingerie Journal, and Lingerie Talk, gave the social enterprise more positive coverage.

== Founders' relationship ==
Schuette proposed to Smith live on an NBC affiliate station on Valentine's Day in 2012.
