= Chari, Kerman =

Chari چاري
- Village
- Location within Iran
- Coordinates: 30°24′22″N 56°30′25″E
- Country: Iran
- Province: Kerman
- County: Rafsanjan
- Bakhsh: Central
- Rural District: Khenaman

Population (2006)
  - Total: 201
- Time zone: UTC+3:30 (IRST)
  - Summer (DST): UTC+4:30 (IRDT)

Chari (Persian: چاري, also Romanized as Chārī; also known as Chārūk (Persian: چاروك) and Charook) is a village in Khenaman Rural District, in the Central District of Rafsanjan County, Kerman Province, Iran. At the 2006 census, its population was 201, in 62 families.
