= Sherry Grace =

American interior designer

Sherry Grace is an American interior designer and the founder of Mothers of Incarcerated Sons, a non-profit organization that provides assistance to parents of children in prison. In 2006 Essence named Grace one of their "50 of the Most Inspiring African-Americans".

== Mothers of Incarcerated Sons ==
Grace launched Mothers of Incarcerated Sons on Mother's Day, 2001 as a support group for mothers whose children are in prison. She noticed the need for such an organization after relating her story to her church's congregation, where she talked about how two of her sons were involved in a string of arrests and eventually jailed. Afterwards, several other churchgoers quietly told her that had sons in prison, as well.

The organization offers support to mothers whose children are caught within the legal system. It also provides legal services to inmates, and assists with acquiring housing and jobs after their release. MIS has more than 200 members in six states, and communicates and visits inmates in 85 different prisons.
