= Sangli-ye Shirin =

Village in North Khorasan province, Iran

Sangli-ye Shirin Persian: سنگلي شيرين
- Village
- Location within Iran
- Coordinates: 37°12′24″N 58°07′48″E
- Country: Iran
- Province: North Khorasan
- County: Faruj
- District: Central
- Rural District: Faruj

Population (2016)
  - Total: 231
- Time zone: UTC+3:30 (IRST)

Sangli-ye Shirin (Persian: سنگلي شيرين) (Note: Also romanized as Sanglī-ye Shīrīn; also known as Sanglī, Sengeli, Sīnglī-ye Shīrīn, and Sīnkelī-ye Shīrīn) is a village in Faruj Rural District of the Central District in Faruj County, North Khorasan province, Iran.

== Demographics ==
=== Population ===
At the time of the 2006 National Census, the village's population was 233 in 54 households. The following census in 2011 counted 250 people in 74 households. The 2016 census measured the population of the village as 231 people in 69 households.
