= Chari-Baguirmi =

Chari-Baguirmi may refer to:

- Chari-Baguirmi Prefecture, one of the 14 prefectures of Chad, 1960–1999
- Chari-Baguirmi Region, one of the 22 regions of Chad, 2002–present
