= Shari Mari =

Shari Mari شري مري
- Village
- Location within Iran
- Coordinates: 31°35′02″N 48°52′33″E
- Country: Iran
- Province: Khuzestan
- County: Ahvaz
- Bakhsh: Central
- Rural District: Anaqcheh

Population (2006)
  - Total: 571
- Time zone: UTC+3:30 (IRST)
  - Summer (DST): UTC+4:30 (IRDT)

Shari Mari (Persian: شري مري, also Romanized as Sharī Marī and Sherī Merī) is a village in Anaqcheh Rural District, in the Central District of Ahvaz County, Khuzestan Province, Iran. At the 2006 census, its population was 571, in 110 families.
