= Accordéon Mélancolique =

Dutch accordion duo

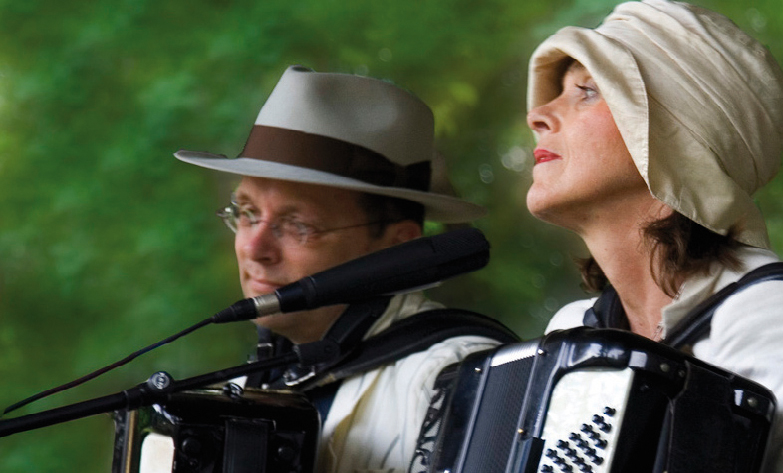
- Open air concert on the Dag van het Nationale Park ("Day of National Parks"), in Park Vreugd en Rust, Voorburg, the Netherlands. Photo E. Brinkman Fotografie.

Background information
- Origin: Driebergen-Rijsenburg, Netherlands
- Genres: Blues; Chanson; Film; Classical; Latin; Tango; World music
- Years active: 1984 - present.
- Labels: Sterkenburg Records
- Members: Cherie de Boer; Jean-Pierre Guiran
- Website: www.acmel.nl

Accordéon Mélancolique is a Dutch accordion duo consisting of Cherie de Boer (born 10 June 1950 in Jakarta) and Jean-Pierre Guiran (born 27 January 1957 in Vlissingen).

The duo is founded in 1984. In 1997 they were asked to play during the fiftieth anniversary of the Marshall-plan in Rotterdam, the Netherlands, for, among others, Bill en Hillary Clinton, Dutch crown prince Willem Alexander and former Dutch prime minister Wim Kok. Their first CD L'Imparfait du Cœur was released in 1998, and was proclaimed by the Swedish accordion magazine Dragspels Nytt as the best accordion CD of 1999. As a result, they played at various festivals in Iceland and Denmark during the summer of 2000 and 2003. In total, seven CDs have been released. The music is also published as sheet music.

== Style ==
The duo plays increasingly more original compositions. Their inspiration comes from French accordion music, French musette waltzes, Italian folk music, Antillean waltzes, Indonesian kronchong melodies, Argentinean tangos, Jewish and Greek folk music, swing standards, Gypsy romantics, classical music, merengues and tex-mex. A central theme is the role of silence in music.

By consciously using silence next to sound as building stones of their music, even the most simple pieces receive an intense thrill and it gives rhythmic melodies an extra sprakle.

== Discography ==
=== CDs ===
Date	Album
2015	Aquarelles
2012	Gratitude
2008	Les Invités
2006	Le Nid Aimé
2003	Petits Fours Frais
2002	Parade des Poules
1998	L'Imparfait du Cœur

=== Sheet music ===
Date	Album
2013	Gratitude
2008	Les Invités
2006	Le Nid Aimé
2002	Parade des Poules
1998	L'Imparfait du Cœur

== Compositions J.P. Guiran ==
Sheet music of Cirque Mazurque (2003).

The compositions of Jean-Pierre Guiran are distinguished by the central role of the melody. The expressiveness is strengthened by timing in various rhythms and by the harmony which receives the role of a second voice.

=== 2015 ===
- Mermaid
- Quicksand
- Swan & Swan
- Aquarelle d’Amour
- Warm Bath
- Damselfly
- Meeting at the Lake
- Watering Place
- Ducklings
- the Heron and the Frog
- Water Cave
- Swell
- Swimming in the Winter
- Lullaby to the Sea
- Ebb and Flow

=== 2012 ===
- Eléphants Blancs
- Swiss Affair
- Gratitude I
- Gratitude II
- Gratitude III
- Bailamos la Vida
- Sans Queue ni Tête
- The Singing Moon
- Seaside
- Cinquante
- Santiago
- Rose de Salon

=== 2008 ===
- L'Arrivée des Invités
- Bougainville
- Clandestin
- The Dancing Tortoise
- Ma Chérie
- Padiki Dikitika
- Por el Camino Real (co-author)
- Requiem pour une Rose
- Tonton Charles
- Tanah Tumpah Darah

=== 2006 ===
- Appelboom
- L'Esprit du Sud
- L'Heure Bleue
- Juif Errant
- Kripi Kripi
- Le Lac Minor
- Le Nid Aimé
- Maria Clara
- Merel
- Mon Chéri
- Solitude Heureuse
- Te Lang Alleen
- Within Five Minutes!

=== 2003 ===
- Cirque Mazurque

=== 2002 ===
- Café Vert
- Helena
- Mango
- Parade des Poules
- Tres Corazones (co-author)
- Une Valse Anglaise S.V.P.

=== 1998 ===
- L'Imparfait du Cœur
- Passé composé

=== 1997 ===
- Polytour

== Usage of music ==
=== Documentaries ===
- Broken Dreams. Suzanne van Leendert, van Osch Films, the Netherlands, 2015.
- Portret van een Tuin. Rosie Stapel, the Netherlands, 2014.
- Boi, Song of a Wanderer. Anne Marie Borsboom Filmproducties, the Netherlands, 2014.
- Appie Baantjer als Diender. Profiel. KRO, the Netherlands, 2008.
- Boren in de Zeebodem. Schooltv, the Netherlands, 2005.
- De Koperen Ploeg. Kristie Stevens, the Netherlands, 2005.
- Oud en der Dagen Zat. IKON, the Netherlands, 2003.
- Picasso and Braque Go to the Movies. Martin Scorsese. United States, 2008.
- Dag je dat wij niks leerde?. Ed van Herpt and Gwen Timmer. Stichting Filmgroep Parabel, the Netherlands, 1981.

=== Films ===
- Something Fishy. Puppet animation. Foolhardy Films, scenario Trevor Hardy. UK, 2012.
- De Laatste Dag. Director Saskia Diesing, scenario Helena van der Meulen. Lemming Film, the Netherlands, 2008.
- If God Wants. Diennet Productions, United States, 2009.

=== Theatre ===
- Because There Isn't Any. Johannes Wieland. Performed by the Juilliard School of Arts, New York, United States, 2008.
- Petites Histoires.com. Kader Atou. Compagnie Accrorap, France, 2008. Performed, among others, in France, the Netherlands, the United States and China.
- Resemblance. Dancers: Melanie Aceto en Claire Jacob-Zysman. Melanie Aceto Contemporary Dance, New York, United States, 2006.
- EWES. Amaury Lebrun. Performed by Compañía Nacional de Danza II, Madrid, Spain, 2010.

=== Tv-drama ===
- Man bijt Hond. NCRV, the Netherlands, Dolle Dries Sterke Zeemansverhalen 2013 / 2014, Dave & Annu 2009.
- De Troon. Avro, the Netherlands, 2010.
