= Cherry DeLefebvre House =

- U.S. National Register of Historic Places
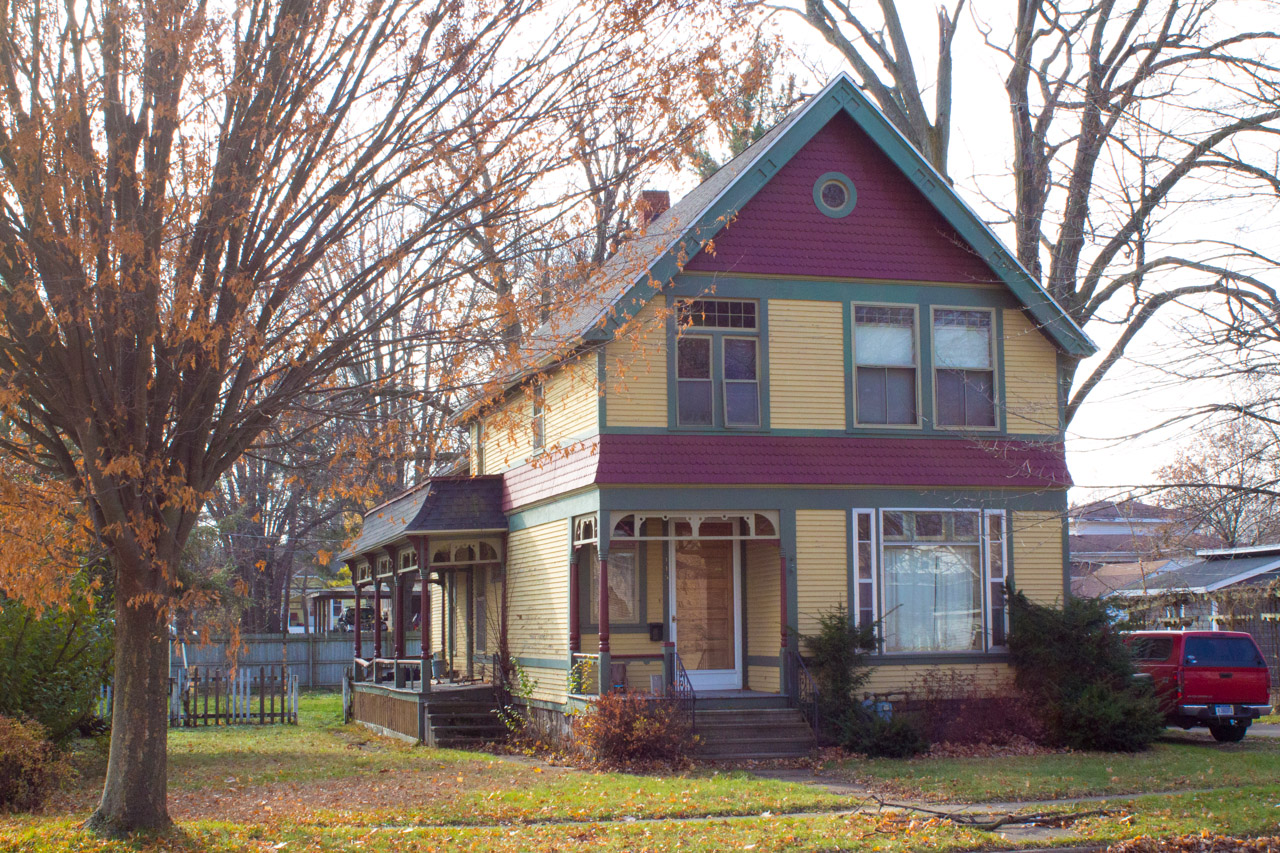

- Location within Michigan Location within the United States
- Interactive map
- Location: 115 W. Chart St., Plainwell, Michigan
- Coordinates: 42°26′30″N 85°38′32″W
- Area: less than one acre
- Built: 1893
- Architectural style: Stick/Eastlake
- MPS: Plainwell MPS
- NRHP reference No.: 91001548
- Added to NRHP: November 1, 1991

The Cherry DeLefebvre House is a private house located at 115 West Chart Street in Plainwell, Michigan. It was listed on the National Register of Historic Places in 1991.

== History ==
Cherry Delefebvre was born in Paris in 1835, and graduated from the École Polytechnique in 1856. He emigrated to the United States in 1859, taught French in New York City and later fought in the Civil War. After the war, he moved to Chicago and worked in the hotel business, eventually buying his own hotel. In 1873, he married Hannah Crispe, the sister of successful Plainwell businessman and politician John Crispe. Delefebvre sold his hotel in 1891, and he and his wife went on an extended voyage. The couple settled in Plainwell in 1893, and constructed this house the same year.

== Description ==
The Cherry DeLefebvre House is a two-story frame structure with a stone foundation and a gable-roof main section and a gabled rear wing. The front gable has a small circular-shaped window below the vergeboard, and is clad with patterned shingling. The main body of the house is clad with clapboard, with a narrow apron of shingling below the second story. A front porch is recessed into one end, and features lathe-turned columns and turned spindles. The windows are double-hung.

The interior of the house features the original wood parquet floors in the living room and dining room, as well as original wood doors, molding, door surroundings, and stairway.

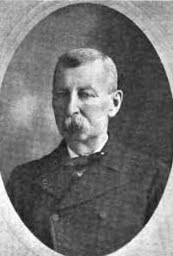
Cherry DeLefebvre

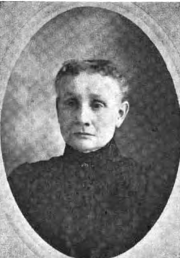
Hannah Crispe DeLefebvre
