= Dalenjan-e Kordiyeh =

Village in North Khorasan province, Iran

Dalenjan-e Kordiyeh Persian: دالنجان کرديه
- Village
- Location within Iran
- Coordinates: 37°06′29″N 58°08′56″E
- Country: Iran
- Province: North Khorasan
- County: Faruj
- District: Central
- Rural District: Faruj

Population (2016)
  - Total: 244
- Time zone: UTC+3:30 (IRST)

Dalenjan-e Kordiyeh (Persian: داليجان كردها) (Note: Also romanized as Dālenjān-e Kordīyeh; formerly known as Dalijan-e Kordha (داليجان كردها), also romanized as Dālījān-e Kordhā) is a village in Faruj Rural District of the Central District in Faruj County, North Khorasan province, Iran.

== Demographics ==
=== Population ===
At the time of the 2006 National Census, the village's population, as Dalijan-e Kordha, was 435 in 89 households. The following census in 2011 counted 306 people in 82 households, by which time the village was listed as Dalenjan-e Kordiyeh. The 2016 census measured the population of the village as 244 people in 68 households.
