= Sherwood (given name) =

Sherwood is a masculine given name. Notable people with this name include:

- Sherwood Anderson (1876–1941) American novelist and short story writer
- Sherwood Bailey (1923–1987), American child actor
- Sherwood Battle Brockwell (1885–1953), American fire marshal
- Sherwood Boehlert (1936–2021), American retired politician
- Sherwood Cryer (1927–2009), American entrepreneur
- Sherwood Eddy (1871–1963), American Protestant missionary, author, administrator and educator
- Sherwood Egbert (1920-1969), President of Studebaker-Packard Corporation and Studebaker Corporation from 1961 to 1963
- Sherwood Gorbach (born 1934), American medical academic
- Sherwood Guernsey (born 1946), Massachusetts state representative
- Sherry Magee (1884-1929), American Major League Baseball player
- Sherwood Schwartz (1916-2011), American television producer
- Sherwood Schwarz (1930–2023), American businessman, former owner of the Toronto Argonauts football team
- Sherwood Smith (born 1951), American fantasy and science fiction writer
- Sherwood C. Spring (born 1944), retired United States Army colonel and former NASA astronaut
