= Dalenjan-e Torkiyeh =

Village in North Khorasan province, Iran

Dalenjan-e Torkiyeh Persian: دالنجان ترکيه
- Village
- Location within Iran
- Coordinates: 37°05′07″N 58°09′44″E
- Country: Iran
- Province: North Khorasan
- County: Faruj
- District: Central
- Rural District: Faruj

Population (2016)
  - Total: 83
- Time zone: UTC+3:30 (IRST)

Dalenjan-e Torkiyeh (Persian: دالنجان ترکيه) (Note: Also romanized as Dālenjān-e Torkīyeh; formerly known as Dalijan-e Torkiyeh, also romanized as Dālījān-e Torkīyeh) is a village in Faruj Rural District of the Central District in Faruj County, North Khorasan province, Iran.

== Demographics ==
=== Population ===
At the time of the 2006 National Census, the village's population, as Dalijan-e Torkiyeh, was 178 in 47 households. The following census in 2011 counted 122 people in 38 households, by which time the village was listed as Dalenjan-e Torkiyeh. The 2016 census measured the population of the village as 83 people in 34 households.
