= Sangli-ye Shur =

Village in North Khorasan province, Iran

Sangli-ye Shur Persian: سنگلي شور
- Village
- Location within Iran
- Coordinates: 37°12′27″N 58°07′20″E
- Country: Iran
- Province: North Khorasan
- County: Faruj
- District: Central
- Rural District: Faruj

Population (2016)
  - Total: 225
- Time zone: UTC+3:30 (IRST)

Sangli-ye Shur (Persian: سنگلي شور) (Note: Also romanized as Sanglī-ye Shūr) is a village in Faruj Rural District of the Central District in Faruj County, North Khorasan province, Iran.

== Demographics ==
=== Population ===
At the time of the 2006 National Census, the village's population was 186 in 56 households. The following census in 2011 counted 238 people in 67 households. The 2016 census measured the population of the village as 225 people in 69 households.
