= Moyen-Chari =

Moyen-Chari may refer to:

- Moyen-Chari Prefecture, a prefecture of Chad 1960–1999
- Moyen-Chari Region, a region of Chad 2002–present
