= Sherilyn Williams-Stroud =

Sherilyn Williams-Stroud has been active in the field of geology for over three decades, where she has been recognized as one of the most important women in the field. In terms of representation in STEM (science, technology, engineering and mathematics). Throughout her career she has been paving the way for women, ethnic minorities, members of the LGBT community as well as other communities to nullify that underrepresentation. Williams-Stroud attended Oberlin College where she studied geology and graduated from in 1981, and she earned both her master's degree in geology (1984) and her PhD in structural geology (1988) from Johns Hopkins University. Although her work is dedicated to sedimentology, geophysics and geochemistry, she does have particular areas of expertise in fracture modelling, stress and strain analysis, rock fracture mechanics with applications to oil and gas production and exploration, geothermal energy, evaporite, geochemistry and other resources. Williams-Stroud created her own company Confractus, Inc. Williams-Stroud is an active member of several professional organizations as well as a leading activist of the Black Lives Matter movement.

== Early life ==
Williams-Stroud's early life began when she graduated from the University City Senior High in Missouri. She received her BA in geology from Oberlin College, MA in geology and PhD in the field of geosciences from Johns Hopkins University. She then later began her first job as a research geologist at the United States Geological Survey in 1988.

As an African-American woman she has been striving for gender and race diversity in the field of geosciences and is now an advocate for the Black Lives Matter movement. Williams-Stroud is also a part of the National Association of Black Geologists and Geophysicists; where she has been a member for the last 25 years.

== Career ==
Williams-Stroud is currently the president and CEO of Confractus, Inc. as well as a research geologist for the Illinois State Geological Survey. Sherilyn is also an associated expert of the TerraEX group, for which she has conducted various geological workshops including "Fractured, Fracturing, and Fracked Reservoirs" in 2019 and "Fracked Reservoir DFN Modeling: Fracture Analysis and Modeling with Induced Microseismicity Data" in 2020. Throughout her career Sherilyn has been very involved in the oil and gas industry, working with companies such as Occidental Oil, Texaco, and Chevron.

The following table gives the history of Sherilyn's contributions to geology and science by listing her past and present occupations:

Position	Institution	Time period
Research geologist	US Geological Survey	October 1988 - July 1998
Senior research scientist	Texaco Exploration	1998–2000
Senior research scientist	ChevronTexaco	January 2000 - August 2004
Principal structural geologist	Midland Valley Exploration	August 2004-March 2008
Geological advisor	MicroSeismic, Inc	March 2008 - May 2012
Chief geologist	MicroSeismic, Inc	May 2012 - September 2012
Senior geological advisor	Oxy	August 2012 - November 2014
Senior geological advisor	California Resources Corp.	November 2014 - February 2016
President and CEO	Confractus, Inc	May 2016 – present
Adjunct faculty member	California State University-Los Angeles	February 2017 - July 2017
Part-time faculty	California State University, Northridge	August 2017 - May 2018
Research geologist	Illinois State Geological Survey	June 2018 – present

== Legacy ==
Williams-Stroud has contributed to several articles about how microseismic monitoring can benefit the process of hydraulic fracking which results in the ability to drill or frack in order to obtain the most oil or gas (microseismic monitoring research). She has helped develop a method to estimate accurate plane fracture plane size using rock lithology and microseismic event source information. This information was used to help see the possible fractures through qualitative representations. She is also responsible for overseeing geological interpretation and the integration of microseismic geological and geomechanical analysis of well simulation.

In 2016 Williams-Stroud delivered guest lecture at the University of Nairobi to inspire young geologists of African American descent to enter the field and alter the diversity.

Williams-Stroud is also an active member of AAPG (American Association of Petroleum Geologists), (SPE) Society of Petroleum Engineers, (SEG) Society of Exploration Geophysicists, (NABGG) National Association of Black Geologists and Geophysicists, (EAGE) European Association of Geoscientists and Engineers, (NASEM) National Academies of Sciences, Engineering, and Medicine.

Her current projects and research includes:

- Decator Project, (CO_{2} sequestration)
- Low cost geothermal energy development and utilization
- Geological storage of nuclear waste
- Integrating induced seismic results with subsurface geological data interpretation

Williams-Stroud has conducted vast amounts of research regarding how carbon secretion activities have been having major effects on a global scale as its large negative contribution towards production of greenhouse gases.

== Publications ==
Publication title	Year	Publication author
The shear strength of gypsum single crystals on three cleavage planes	1988	SC Williams, Tectonophysics 148 (1-2), 163-173
The evolution of an inland sea of marine origin to a non-marine saline lake: the Pennsylvanian Paradox salt	1994	S Williams-Stroud, Special Publications of SEPM
Solution to the paradox? Results of some chemical equilibrium and mass balance calculations applied to the Paradox basin evaporite deposit	1994	SC Williams-Stroud, American Journal of Science 294 (10), 1189–1228
Initiation and growth of gypsum piercement structures in the Zechstein Basin	1997	SC Williams-Stroud, J Paul, Journal of Structural Geology 19 (7), 897-907
Characterizing the Fracture Network at Yucca Mountain, Nevada Part 1. Integration of Field Data for Numerical Simulations	1997	DS Sweetkind, LO Anna, SC Williams-Stroud, JA Coe, Rocky Mountain Association of Geologists
Using microseismic events to constrain fracture network models and implications for generating fracture flow properties for reservoir simulation	2005	S Williams-Stroud, SPE Shale Gas Production Conference
Marcellus microseismic	2009	PM Duncan, S Williams-Stroud, Oil and Gas Investor 10, 65-67
Geological Microseismic Fracture Mapping- Methodologies for Improved Interpretations Based on Seismology and Geologic Context	2009	By S.C. Williams-Stroud and Leo Eisner
Moving outside of the borehole: Characterizing natural fractures through microseismic monitoring	2010	S Williams-Stroud, JE Kilpatrick, B Cornette, L Eisner, M Hall, First Break 28 (7)
Beyond the dots in the box: Microseismicity-constrained fracture models for reservoir simulation,	2010	L Eisner, S Williams-Stroud, A Hill, P Duncan, M Thornton. The Leading Edge 29 (3), 326-333
Stimulated fractured reservoir DFN models calibrated with microseismic source mechanisms	2010	SC Williams-Stroud, L Eisner, 44th US Rock Mechanics Symposium and 5th US-Canada Rock Mechanics Symposium
Natural fracture characterization from microseismic source mechanisms: a comparison with FMI data	2010	JE Kilpatrick, L Eisner, S Williams-Stroud, B Cornette, M Hall, 2010 SEG Annual Meeting
Identifying faults and fractures in unconventional reservoirs through microseismic monitoring	2011	SA Wessels, A De La Peña, M Kratz, S Williams-Stroud, T Jbeili, First break 29 (7)
Fault or Frac? Source Mechanism and B-value Detection of Fault Fracturing-A Barnett Case Study	2011	A De La Pena, SA Wessels, AR Gunnell, KJ Numa, S Williams-Stroud, 3rd EAGE Conference and Exhibition incorporating SPE EUROPEC 2011, cp-238-00782
Induced hydraulic fractures or reactivated natural fractures? Modeling the response of natural fracture networks to stimulation treatments	2012	SC Williams-Stroud, WB Barker, KL Smith, 46th US Rock Mechanics/Geomechanics Symposium
Using Microseismicity To Understand Subsurface Fracture Systems and Increase the Effectiveness of Completions: Eagle Ford Formation, Texas	2012	J Detring, S Williams-Stroud, SPE Canadian Unconventional Resources Conference
The relationship of brine chemistry of the Pennsylvanian Paradox Evaporite Basin (southwestern USA) to secular variation in seawater chemistry	2012	By Oleh Yosypovych Petrychenko, Sherilyn Coretta Williams-Stroud, and Tadeusz Marek Peryt
The major-ion composition of Carboniferous seawater	2014	NM Holt, J García-Veigas, TK Lowenstein, PS Giles, S Williams-Stroud, Geochimica et Cosmochimica Acta 134, 317-334
Method for determining discrete fracture networks from passive seismic signals and its application to subsurface reservoir simulation	2014	SC Williams-Stroud, L Eisner, US Patent 8,902,710
Analysis of Microseismicity and Reactivated Fault Size to Assess the Potential for Felt Events by CO2 Injection in the Illinois Basin	2020	By Sherilyn Williams‐Stroud; Robert Bauer; Hannes Leetaru; Volker Oye; Frantisek Stanek; Sallie Greenberg; Nadege Langet
