= Sharon Block =

Sharon Block may refer to:

- Sharon Block (politician), member of the Idaho House of Representatives
- Sharon Block (government official), American attorney, government official, labor policy advisor and law professor
- Sharon Block (scholar), American academic specializing in the history of race in early American history
