= Cherie Ditcham =

Australian actress and model

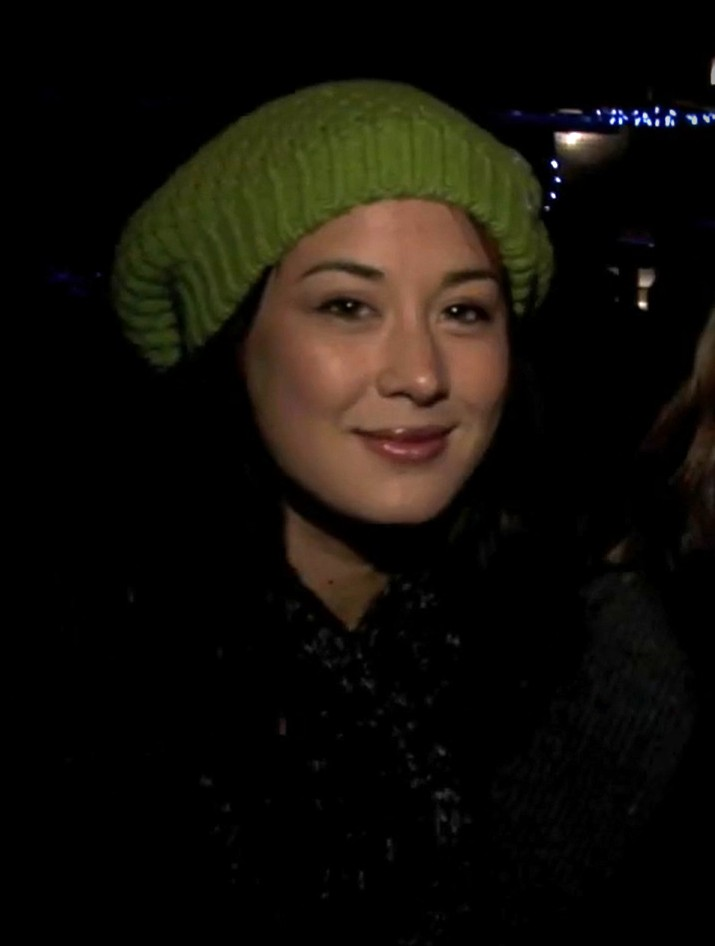
- Ditcham in 2009
- Born: Cherie Leena Ditcham; 11 October 1981 (age 45); Melbourne, Australia
- Occupations: Actress, Model
- Years active: 1997-present

Cherie Leena Ditcham (born 11 October 1981, in Melbourne, Australia) is an Australian actress and model affiliated with Wilhelmina Models and NTA Talent Agency. She was co-host of HDNet's travel series Get Out!, seasons 10 and 11 with Lindsay Clubine. Ditcham won the search for a co-host broadcast during Season 9. Ditcham resides in Los Angeles.

== Career ==
Ditcham has an Australian/Malaysian background with an Australian father with roots in England and a Chinese-Malay mother. Her modelling career began before she graduated from Monash University in 2006 with a degree in marketing and advertising. She has appeared in numerous photo shoots, TV commercials, and fashion shows.

== Filmography ==
- More Than It Is 2010– Charlie
- Lovers 2008– Qiu
- The Dark 2008– Sylvia
- The Storm Awaits 2007– Cafe Patron 2
