= Sherry Sylvester =

American journalist

Sherry Sylvester is an American political worker and journalist. She was the communications director for Doug Forrester's 2005 campaign for Governor of New Jersey.

She served briefly as the communications director for the Republican Party of Texas after heading Texas Media Watch, a project of the Lone Star Foundation, that reported on bias in the Texas press.

She graduated from Oklahoma State University. In 2005, Sylvester was named Alumna of the Year by the Graduate School of Political Management, now at George Washington University.

Sylvester is the Senior Advisor to Texas Lt. Gov. Dan Patrick. Sylvester formerly was a San Antonio-based political consultant, whose clients include Texans for Lawsuit Reform .

As a journalist, Sylvester won awards in both New Jersey and Texas. She was the political writer at the San Antonio Express-News, stepping down in early 2003. Sylvester was the Chief Political Writer for the Trentonian in Trenton, New Jersey for almost a decade. Her political commentary appeared there and in several Gannett-owned state newspapers.
