= Women's Writing in Colombia =

2016 monograph by Cherilyn Elston

Women's Writing in Colombia: An Alternative History
- Author: Cherilyn Elston
- Publisher: Palgrave Macmillan
- Publication date: 2016
- ISBN: 9783319432601

Women's Writing in Colombia: An Alternative History is a 2016 monograph by Cherilyn Elston, a scholar and translator at the University of Reading. Based on her doctoral thesis, the book surveys writing by Colombian women since the 1970s.

It won the Latin American Studies Association's Montserrat Ordóñez prize in 2018. It was positively reviewed in the Bulletin of Spanish Studies, Tulsa Studies in Women's Literature, and Perifrasis.
