= Rashvanlu, Shirvan =

Village in North Khorasan, Iran

Rashvanlu رشوانلو
- Village
- Location within Iran
- Coordinates: 37°38′52″N 58°01′04″E
- Country: Iran
- Province: North Khorasan
- County: Shirvan
- Bakhsh: Central
- Rural District: Sivkanlu

Population (2006)
  - Total: 183
- Time zone: UTC+3:30 (IRST)
  - Summer (DST): UTC+4:30 (IRDT)

Rashvanlu (Persian: رشوانلو, also Romanized as Rashvānlū) is a village in Sivkanlu Rural District, in the Central District of Shirvan County, North Khorasan Province, Iran. At the 2006 census, its population was 183, in 47 families.
