= Sylvia Sherry =

Sylvia Sherry (née Blunt) (born 21 April 1932) is an English author.

She is best known for her book A Pair of Jesus Boots (1969), a popular novel for children and young adults set in the post-war slums of Liverpool. The book was adapted as Rocky O'Rourke for a BBC drama serial in 1976. Four other Rocky O'Rourke books followed. Her earlier works use settings and characters drawn from Malaysia and Singapore.

Her former husband was the biographer Norman Sherry.

== Other works ==
- Street of the Small Night Market (1966), set in Singapore's Chinatown
- Frog in a Coconut Shell (1968)
- The Haven-Screamers (also published as The Loss of the "Night Wind") (1970)
- A Snake in the Old Hut (1972)
- Dark River, Dark Mountain (1975)
- A Pair of Desert Wellies (1985)
- Elephants Have Right of Way (1995)
