= Cherie Templer =

New Zealand painter

- Born: 1856
- Died: 1915 (aged 58–59)

Cherie Templer (née Connell; 1856–1915) was a New Zealand painter. Her work is held in the collection of the National Library of New Zealand.

== Biography ==
Templer was born in Auckland in 1856, to William Connell and Isabella Connell (née Ridings). Her parents had migrated to New Zealand on the ship London in 1840. From the 1870s to the 1890s Templer painted scenes from around the Auckland region, including Devonport, Waiheke Island and the Waitākere Ranges. Her paintings show the houses and camps of the white settlers who were moving into the region at the time.

In 1884 she married Francis Henry Templer; they had one son, Harold Edward. The couple later moved to England to live.

Templer died in Surrey, England in 1915.
