= Rashvanlu, Faruj =

Village in North Khorasan province, Iran

Rashvanlu Persian: رشوانلو
- Village
- Location within Iran
- Coordinates: 37°07′41″N 58°03′37″E
- Country: Iran
- Province: North Khorasan
- County: Faruj
- District: Central
- Rural District: Faruj

Population (2016)
  - Total: 559
- Time zone: UTC+3:30 (IRST)

Rashvanlu (Persian: رشوانلو) (Note: Also romanized as Rashvānlū) is a village in Faruj Rural District of the Central District in Faruj County, North Khorasan province, Iran.

== Demographics ==
=== Population ===
At the time of the 2006 National Census, the village's population was 618 in 153 households. The following census in 2011 counted 599 people in 154 households. The 2016 census measured the population of the village as 559 people in 187 households.
