= Norman Sherry =

British author (1925–2016)

Norman Sherry FRSL (6 July 1925 – 19 October 2016) was an English novelist, biographer, and educator who was best known for his three-volume biography of the British novelist Graham Greene. He was Professor of English Literature at Lancaster University.

Sherry was born in Newcastle Upon Tyne, England, the younger twin (by eleven minutes) of Alan. Sherry studied at King's College, Newcastle, where he graduated with a Bachelor of Arts degree in 1955.

He was a Fellow of the Royal Society of Literature. He also wrote on Joseph Conrad, Charlotte and Emily Brontë, and Jane Austen. His Life of Graham Greene was praised by David Lodge for being "a remarkable and heroic achievement" that he predicted would prove "the definitive biography of record" of Greene. Sherry’s third and final volume of his biography of Graham Greene aroused controversy and was criticised by members of Greene’s family.

From 1983, Sherry held the post of Mitchell Distinguished Professor of Literature at Trinity University in San Antonio, Texas.

He was married three times: first to the children's novelist Sylvia Sherry, then to Carmen Flores (with whom he had a son and a daughter), and finally to Pat Villalon. Sherry died on 19 October 2016 at the age of 91.

== Bibliography ==
=== Books ===
- Sherry, Norman (1966). Conrad's Eastern World. Cambridge University Press.
- — (1980). Conrad's Western World. Cambridge University Press.
- — (1989). The life of Graham Greene : volume one, 1904–1939. London: Jonathan Cape.
- — (1994). The life of Graham Greene : volume two, 1939–1955. London: Jonathan Cape.
- — (1999). The life of Graham Greene : volume three, 1955–1991. London: Jonathan Cape.

=== Critical studies and reviews ===
- Schmude, Karl G. (October 1995). "The character on the page". Books. Quadrant. 39 (10): 83–84. Review of volume 2 of The life of Graham Greene.
