= Delijan, Rudsar =

Delijan دليجان
- Village
- Location within Iran
- Coordinates: 36°47′16″N 50°17′52″E
- Country: Iran
- Province: Gilan
- County: Rudsar
- Bakhsh: Rahimabad
- Rural District: Siyarastaq Yeylaq

Population (2006)
  - Total: 55
- Time zone: UTC+3:30 (IRST)
  - Summer (DST): UTC+4:30 (IRDT)

Delijan (Persian: دليجان, also Romanized as Delījān) is a village in Siyarastaq Yeylaq Rural District, Rahimabad District, Rudsar County, Gilan Province, Iran. At the time of the 2006 census, its population was 55 spread across 22 families.
