= Shari Mendelson =

American artist and educator (born 1961)

- Born: 1961 (age 64–65); United States
- Education: Arizona State University, State University of New York at New Paltz
- Known for: Sculpture

Shari Mendelson (born 1961, Schenectady, New York) is an American artist and educator, known for her sculptures of animals, fertility figures, and vessels made of recycled plastic materials. She is based in Brooklyn and upstate New York in the Catskills.

== About ==
Shari Mendelson has a BFA degree from Arizona State University. She has a MFA degree from State University of New York at New Paltz, graduating in 1968.

Her work is reminiscent of ancient-appearing antiquities and figurines made of intricate glass, however her work is all newly made from used plastic trash, acrylic resin, hot glue, and various other materials. She started creating this body of work in 2009. Mendelson would collect plastic bottles from her friends and family, as well as foraging for the prized bottles in the early mornings in Williamsburg.

Mendelson's art addresses issues of history, culture, environmental awareness, and consumerism. Her work visually references ancient Assyrian, Babylonian, Sasanian, Roman cultural art forms.

She is a lecturer at Parsons School of Design and has additionally taught at Pratt Institute, the University of the Arts, and the Maryland Institute College of Art (MICA).

In 2015, Mendelson was an artist in residency at Corning Museum of Glass. In 2017, she was awarded the Guggenheim fellowship in fine arts by the John Simon Guggenheim Memorial Foundation. In 2019, Mendelson was awarded a MacDowell Colony fellowship.

Her work is in various public museum collections including the Rhode Island School of Design Museum, Museum of Fine Arts, Boston, among others. Her piece, Animal with Caged Vessel, was acquired by the Smithsonian American Art Museum as part of the Renwick Gallery's 50th Anniversary Campaign.
