= Shari Thurer =

American psychologist

Shari Thurer is a psychoanalytically trained psychologist practicing in Boston and an adjunct associate professor at Boston University.

== Select publications ==
She is the author of

- The Myths of Motherhood: How Culture Reinvents the Good Mother ISBN 0-14-024683-5
- The End of Gender: A Psychological Autopsy ISBN 0-415-92771-4
- Beyond the Binary: Essays on Gender ISBN 9781912691876
