= Shari Flanzer =

American poker player

World Series of Poker
- Bracelet: 1
- Money finish: 1
- Highest WSOP Main Event finish: None

Shari Flanzer was a World Series of Poker champion in the 1992 $1,000 Ladies - Limit 7 Card Stud event.

Her total live tournament winnings exceed $62,000.

== World Series of Poker bracelets ==
Year	Tournament	Prize (US$)
1992	$1,000 Ladies - Limit 7 Card Stud	$98,000
