= Sharon Yaish =

Israeli director

- שרון יעיש
- Occupations: Director; Editor; Writer
- Known for: A Whore Like Me
- Awards: Docaviv

Sharon Yaish (Hebrew: שרון יעיש) is an Israeli director and editor known for her documentary film A Whore Like Me (2019).

== Career ==
Sharon Yaish is an Israeli director and editor who wrote and co-directed Israeli documentary film A Whore Like Me, which revolves around the life of a Hungarian woman named Csilla, who was abducted and sold to a prostitution ring in Israel. The film was praised by critics, one of whom called "one of the most important films ever made about prostitution. The film won Ophir Award for Best Documentary under 60 minutes and was nominated for Best Israeli Film in Docaviv Film Festival.

Sharon Yaish earlier won the Best Editing Award in Docaviv Film Festival for the film Elish's Notebooks in the year 2017.

== Filmography ==
=== Director ===
- A Whore Like Me - 2019
- lost angeles - 2022

=== Writer ===
- God Deserves a House - 2018
- The Rabbi from Hezbollah - 2019
- A Whore Like Me - 2019

=== Editor ===
- Broke - 2015
- Don't Call Me Cute - 2016
- Elish's Notebooks - 2017
- God Deserves a House - 2018
- A Whore Like Me (Documentary) - 2019
- The Rabbi from Hezbollah - 2019
- love it was not - 2020
- closed circuit - 2022
