= Cheri Register =

American author and teacher

Cheri Register (April 30, 1945 – March 7, 2018) was an American author and teacher. She wrote seven books and co-authored three, the most famous of which, Packinghouse Daughter, is a memoir based on her working-class upbringing in her hometown of Albert Lea, Minnesota. She was a two-time Minnesota Book Awards winner. Register earned a Ph.D. from University of Chicago where she also received her B.A. and M.A. degrees.

She also wrote about her experiences as mother of two adopted Korean children. Prior to taking up a writing career, she taught and published work on Scandinavian, primarily Swedish, women's history and literature. She taught classes in memoir writing at The Loft Literary Center.

She was Assistant Professor of Women's Studies at the University of Minnesota.

She suffered from Caroli disease, and documented her experiences in The Chronic Illness Experience: Embracing the Imperfect Life. Register died March 7, 2018.

== Bibliography ==
- American Feminist Literary Criticism: A Bibliographical Introduction (1975), In Feminist Literary Criticism, Edited by Josephine Donovan, pp. 1–28.
- Kvinnokamp och litteratur i USA och Sverige (1977), ISBN 91-29-50215-2
- Mothers-Saviours-Peacemakers: Swedish Women Writers in the Twentieth Century (1983), ISSN 0280-1809
- Living With Chronic Illness: Days of Patience and Passion (1987), ISBN 0-02-925730-1
- Are Those Kids Yours?: American Families With Children Adopted From Other Countries (1990), ISBN 0-02-925750-6
- The Chronic Illness Experience: Embracing the Imperfect Life (1999), ISBN 1-56838-346-0
- Packinghouse Daughter: A Memoir (2000), ISBN 0-87351-391-6
- Beyond Good Intentions: A Mother Reflects On Raising Internationally Adopted Children (2005), ISBN 1-59743-000-5
- The Big Marsh: The Story of A Lost Landscape (2016), ISBN 0873519957
