= Shari Olefson =

American lawyer

Honorable Shari Beth Africk-Olefson

Circuit Court Judge, Broward County
- Incumbent
- Assumed office January 2019
- Preceded by: Paul Backman

Personal details
- Born: Shari Beth Olefson; 1963 (age 62–63) New York City
- Education: Carnegie Mellon University (B.A.); Benjamin N. Cardozo School of Law (J.D.); University of Miami School of Law (L.L.M.)

Shari Beth Africk-Olefson (born 1963) is an elected Broward County Circuit Court Judge. She was elected in August 2018.

She has been certified by The Florida Bar in real estate law.

== Early life and education ==
Africk-Olefson was born in New York City and raised both in New York and Florida, where she graduated from Pine Crest School in 1981. She graduated from the Carnegie Mellon University with degrees in journalism and psychology in 1985, from the Benjamin N. Cardozo School of Law at Yeshiva University, and from the University of Miami Masters of Law program in 1989. In 2023, she received the Alumni Achievement Award from U.M. School of Law.

Following her graduation from the U.M. School of Law, Africk-Olefson studied broadcast journalism at Columbia University and earned a master's degree in psychology from Nova Southeastern University.

== Career ==
While in law school, Africk-Olefson interned at the Broward County Public Defenders office and worked for a New York City based law firm before opening a general private practice in South Florida.

In 2002, Africk-Olefson, then president of Virtual Media Networks, filed a patent for technology to help create virtual tours of U.S. college campuses. At the time, she was not a practicing attorney. In 2007, she worked for Arnstein & Lehr.

Multiple news outlets quoted Africk-Olefson as a Florida real estate law expert during the subprime mortgage and the 2010 foreclosure crises, as well as the period following. (Note: Africk-Olefson was interviewed or quoted in 2009 by The Wall Street Journal; in 2010 by National Mortgage News, CNBC, and The Palm Beach Post; in 2011 by the Miami Herald; in 2012 on the Nightly Business Report; in 2014 by Yahoo Finance; and in 2015 by CBS This Morning.) She worked for Tampa-based law firm Fowler White Boggs during this period, which she had joined in January 2009. During this same time, she also became a resource for policy makers and worked with Florida's Collins Center, meditating residential foreclosure cases.

In May 2012, Africk-Olefson was dismissed from Fowler White Boggs, for which she filed a suit alleging discrimination in 2013. Though the suit mentioned Africk-Olefson's lesbianism, her sexual orientation was not included in the claim.

Africk-Olefson served as director of The Carnegie Group. She also established the Women’s Equal Pay Network in 2012.

=== Circuit court judge ===
On May 4, 2018, Africk-Olefson enter the Florida primary race for Broward Circuit Court judge, Group 36. The Dolphin Democrats, Broward County's LGBTQ caucus, endorsed her, as did the Broward County chapter of the Fraternal Order of Police. Between May 4 and August 10, Africk-Olefson spent US$385,592 for her campaign, with US$365,000 of it being her own funds.

She won the election in August 2018, and was sworn in by Chief Judge Jack Tuter on 7 January 2019 to begin serving in the Juvenile Dependency division.

In February 2026, Africk-Olefson granted an emergency injunction to stop Pembroke Park commissioners from voting on the removal of Mayor Geoffrey Jacobs while he was in Alaska on business. In March, she heard arguments in the case of Jacobs v. Town of Pembroke Park and ruled in favor of Jacobs, that the commissioners could not oust the mayor from his elected position and subvert the will of voters.

== Selected publications ==
=== Articles ===
- Olefson, Shari (May 2013). "FHA, Fannie and Freddie: What's Government's Role in Housing?". Loan Think. National Mortgage News.
- Olefson, Shari (June 2013). "Tax Policy Change Could Hurt Homeowners". Origination News. Vol. 22, no. 9. p. 4. Gale A332235309.
- Taylor Barner, Florence; Africk-Olefson, Shari; Gillespie, Kenneth L.; Izquierdo, Jose (March 10, 2026). "Thinking of suing? Here's how things work in small claims court". Sun Sentinel.

=== Books ===
- Olefson, Shari (2009). "The State of Foreclosure in the State of Florida". In Mayberry, Jodine; Higgins, Donna (eds.). Florida Foreclosure: What Lawyers Need to Know Now. Andrews Publications. ISBN 9780314907271. OCLC 449219817.
- Olefson, Shari (2009). Foreclosure Nation: Mortgaging the American Dream. Amherst, NY: Prometheus Books. ISBN 978-1-59102-663-1.
- Olefson, Shari B.; Ruben, Joel D.; Meyerson, Alfred M.; et al. (2011). Structuring Commercial Real Estate Transactions Leading Lawyers on Facilitating Successful Deals and Contracts that Meet Client Needs. Inside the Minds. Aspatore. ISBN 978-0-31427-803-6. OCLC 738363823.
- Olefson, Shari (2013). Financial Fresh Start: Your Five-Step Plan for Adapting and Prospering in the New Economy. New York: Amacom. ISBN 978-0-81443-229-7 – via Internet Archive.

== Personal life ==
Africk-Olefson married Pamela Africk on March 1, 2018.

== Sources ==
- "Announcements". 17th Judicial Circuit of Florida (Press release). January 7, 2019.
- "Financial Fresh Start (review)". Midwest Book Review Watch. March 2013. Gale A710685356.
- "Financial Fresh Start: Your Five-Step Plan for Adapting and Prospering in the New Economy (review)". Publishers Weekly. Vol. 259, no. 50. December 10, 2012. p. 50. Gale A312402556.
- Martindale-Hubbell Law Directory. Vol. 6. New Providence, NJ: Martindale-Hubbell, Inc. 1999. ISBN 978-1-561-60324-4 – via Internet Archive.
- "Realtor Association of Palm Beach International Business Event at Trump Tower Palm Beach" (PDF). Preferred Property Finder. January 2007. Archived from the original (PDF) on August 30, 2014.
- "Shari Beth Africk-Olefson the more measured choice for judge in Broward Circuit, Group 36". Editorial. Sun Sentinel. December 13, 2018 [June 16, 2018].
- US Abandoned 20020116297, Olefson, Shari, "Method and apparatus for providing a virtual tour of a dormitory or other institution to a prospective resident", published August 22, 2002
- Arenas, Vicente (July 15, 2015). "You know, Miami is known for its flash and bling (transcript)". CBS This Morning. Gale A422036509.
- Behnken, Shannon (December 31, 2009). "High court's foreclosure ruling means more mediators needed". The Tampa Tribune. p. 10. Gale A216272580.
- Behnken, Shannon (July 22, 2009). "Next collapse may be worse". The Tampa Tribune. p. 1. Gale A204473965.
- Brinkmann, Paul (January 23, 2013). "Attorney Shari Olefson files discrimination lawsuit against Fowler White Boggs". American City Business Journals. Archived from the original on January 28, 2013.
- Duggan, Ed (September 7, 2002). "DORMtours takes an educated leap". American City Business Journals. Vol. 22, no. 4. p. 17A. Gale A78438672.
- Gale, Kevin (October 11, 2010). "Foreclosure Fallout Grows". American City Business Journals. Archived from the original on October 14, 2010.
- Gharib, Susie (March 23, 2012). "Nightly Business Report (transcript)". Nightly Business Report. Gale A283996253.
- Goodkind, Nicole (August 26, 2014). "Housing market stuck in downward spiral: Shari Olefson". Yahoo Finance. Archived from the original on August 29, 2014.
- Man, Anthony (April 7, 2019) [June 5, 2018]. "Broward arm of big police union drops Wasserman Schultz, endorses Republican". Sun Sentinel.
- Man, Anthony (April 7, 2019) [July 17, 2018]. "LGBT Democrats recommend choice for governor". Sun Sentinel.
- McCarthy, John (October 18, 2009). "Saving your home". Florida Today. ProQuest 239529488.
- Miller, Kimberly (February 17, 2010). "CitiMortgage's pitch to delinquent borrowers: Give us the keys and you can stay free for six months". The Palm Beach Post. Gale A219101032.
- Moore, C.J. (November 15, 2010). "How Underwater Homes Shape Buying Prospects". National Mortgage News. Vol. 35, no. 9. p. 4. Gale A242094986.
- Nevins, Buddy (2018). "Broward Politics: New Ideas For Campaign Signs". BrowardBeat.com.
- Nevins, Buddy (2018). "Campaign Turned Topsy-Turvy: $11 Million Whale Enters Local Race". BrowardBeat.com. Archived from the original on July 23, 2021.
- Odzer, Ari (February 10, 2026). "Judge halts Pembroke Park commissioners' effort to oust mayor over residency controversy". WTVJ.
- O'Hara, Rosemary; Sweeney, Dan; Bousquet, Steve; Anderson, Julie, eds. (July 28, 2020) [June 14, 2020]. "Endorsement: Smart and experienced, incumbent Judge Patti Henning is best choice in Broward Circuit Court, Group 18". Sun Sentinel.
- Olefson, Shari (June 22, 2009). "Taking a Hard Look at Missteps". St. Petersburg Times (Interview). p. 4B. Gale A202198062.
- Olmeda, Rafael (December 13, 2018) [May 4, 2018]. "Crowded field running for five open seats on Broward Circuit Court bench". Sun Sentinel.
- Olmeda, Rafael (July 1, 2019) [August 31, 2018]. "Four Broward judicial races head for November runoffs". Sun Sentinel.
- Olorunnipa, Toluse (January 10, 2011). "Foreclosure crisis hits home for all". Miami Herald.
- Owers, Paul (May 24, 2010). "Analysts expect barrage of lender lawsuits to recoup mortgage debt". The Palm Beach Post. Archived from the original on June 11, 2010.
- Perlmuter, Roger; Kinkopf, Daryl R., eds. (2008). Lawyer's Register International by Specialties and Fields of Law Including a Directory of Corporate Counsel. Vol. 1 (25th ed.). Cleveland, OH: Lawyer's Register Publishing Company. ISBN 0-936217-61-8. ISSN 1061-7272 – via Internet Archive.
- Pilon, Mary (February 11, 2009). "For Some, It's Finally Time to Dive Into Housing Market". The Wall Street Journal. Archived from the original on April 1, 2015.
- Rosa, Amanda (March 20, 2026). "Judge says Broward town commission cannot oust controversial mayor". Miami Herald.
- Taylor, John (June 2009). "Foreclosure Nation (review)". Midwest Book Review Watch. Gale A201802971.
- Valencia, Michelle (April 7, 2023). "Alumni Receive Awards at Broward Judicial Reception". University of Miami School of Law. Archived from the original on January 16, 2026.
- Walters, Natalie (August 22, 2016). "Homeowners Forecasted to Spend Record Amount on Remodeling". TheStreet. Gale A461270289.
- Winter, Christine (August 13, 2001). "Virtual Tours Come to College Dorms". Sun Sentinel. ProQuest 387986747.
