= Cheri Huber =

American meditation teacher

- Title: Writer; Teacher

Personal life
- Born: c. 1944 (age 81–82)

Religious life
- Religion: Buddhism
- School: Sōtō
- Lineage: Unknown

Senior posting
- Based in: Zen Monastery Peace Center
- Website: cherihuber.com

Cheri Huber (born c. 1944) is an American meditation teacher in the Sōtō School of Zen Buddhism tradition.

== Biography ==
Huber is the founder and guiding teacher of Zen Monastery Peace Center located in Murphys, California, which was constructed in 1993. The plot of land was purchased in 1987, with 320 acres (1.3 km^{2}). She was raised in the San Francisco Bay area and claims to have studied Zen under Jay DuPont. Writer Anna Kaplan says that Huber had once desired to live in a cabin in the woods in isolation of the world, but was encouraged by another teacher to teach Zen. The name of this teacher is not named. She founded her first Zen center in 1983 in Mountain View, California, which has since moved to Palo Alto under the name Palo Alto Zen Center. In 1997, Huber founded Living Compassion, a nonprofit organization dedicated to peace and service. Huber's current center, Four Acre Zen Center (FAZC), is located in Sequim, WA.

There have been some questions raised by about her authority to teach Zen from some members of the traditional, lineage-based Zen community. Author and ordained Buddhist priest James Ishmael Ford writes of her, "Perhaps the most prominent of apparently self-declared teachers is the widely read author and meditation teacher Cheri Huber. Huber may have studied briefly with Jay DuPont...but it is not clear that she was authorized to teach by him or anyone else as a Zen teacher." However, Huber herself has never claimed to be an authorized teacher of any particular lineage, stating that she considers herself a "student" of Zen who has dedicated her life to helping others learn to live in "conscious, compassionate awareness."

In addition to authoring or co-authoring a number of books based in Zen awareness practice, Huber has offered a number of interactive email courses (some of which have become the basis of books). Beginning in 2002, she has offered a free weekly podcast which began as a call-in radio show. Archives of past shows are available online.

== Bibliography ==
- How You Do Anything Is How You Do Everything: A Workbook. Keep It Simple Books. 1988. ISBN 0-9636255-5-1.
- That Which You Are Seeking Is Causing You to Seek. Keep It Simple Books. 1990. ISBN 0-9614754-6-3.
- The Fear Book: Facing Fear Once and for All. Keep It Simple Books. 1995. ISBN 0-9636255-1-9.
- Nothing Happens Next: Responses to Questions About Meditation. Keep It Simple Books. 1995. ISBN 0-9636255-3-5.
- Trying to Be Human: Zen Talks from Cheri Huber. Keep It Simple Books. 1995. ISBN 0-9630784-1-0.
- Being Present in the Darkness. Penguin Group. 1996. ISBN 0-399-52223-9.
- Be the Person You Want to Find: Relationship and Self-Discovery. Keep It Simple Books. 1997. ISBN 0-9636255-2-7.
- Good Life: A Zen Precepts Retreat with Cheri Huber. Keep It Simple Books. 1997. ISBN 0-9630784-2-9.
- The Key: And the Name of the Key Is Willingness. Keep It Simple Books. 1999. ISBN 0-9636255-4-3.
- Sex and Money: Are Dirty, Aren't They?. Keep It Simple Books. 1999. ISBN 0-9636255-7-8.
- Buddha Facing the Wall: Interviews with American Zen Monks. Keep It Simple Books. 1999. ISBN 0-9630784-3-7.
- How to Get from Where You Are to Where You Want to Be. Hay House. 2000. ISBN 1-56170-715-5.
- Sweet Zen: Dharma Talks from Cheri Huber. Present Perfect Books. 2000. ISBN 0-9630784-4-5.
- There Is Nothing Wrong With You for Teens. Keep It Simple Books. 2001. ISBN 0-9636255-9-4.
- There Is Nothing Wrong with You: Going Beyond Self-Hate. Keep It Simple Books. 2001. ISBN 0-9710309-0-1.
- Suffering Is Optional: Three Keys to Freedom and Joy. Keep It Simple Books. 2002. ISBN 0-9636255-8-6.
- When You're Falling, Dive: Acceptance, Freedom and Possibility. Keep It Simple Books. 2003. ISBN 0-9614754-7-1.
- The Zen Monastery Cookbook: Stories and Recipes from a Zen Kitchen. Keep It Simple Books. 2003.
- The Depression Book: Depression as an Opportunity for Spiritual Growth. Keep It Simple Books. 2004. ISBN 0-9636255-6-X.
- Transform Your Life: A Year of Awareness Practice. Keep It Simple Books. 2007. ISBN 0-9710309-5-2.
- Making A Change For Good : A Guide To Compassionate Self-Discipline. Shambhala Publications. 2007. ISBN 1-59030-208-7.
- What You Practice Is What You Have : A Guide to Having the Life You Want. Keep It Simple. 2010. ISBN 0-9710309-7-9.
- I Don't Want To, I Don't Feel Like It: How Resistance Controls Your Life and What to Do About It. Keep It Simple. 2013. ISBN 0-9614754-9-8.
- Don't Suffer, Communicate!: A Zen Guide to Compassionate Communication. 2019. ISBN 0991596374.

=== As co-author ===
- Guyol, Melinda (1994). Time-out for Parents: A Compassionate Approach to Parenting. CompassionWorks. ISBN 0-9614754-4-7.

=== Audio ===
- Being Present in the Darkness. B&B Audio. 1996. ISBN 1-882071-79-4.
- Unconditional Self-Acceptance (The Do It Yourself Course). Sounds True. 2005. ISBN 1-59179-237-1.

=== DVD ===
- The Secret Is There Are No Secrets: An Introduction To Zen Meditation With Cheri Huber. Openings. 2004. OCLC 83259812.

== See also ==
- Buddhism in the United States
