= Shari Rhodes =

American casting director and producer

Shari Swofford Rhodes
- Born: Shari Swofford; July 14, 1938; Paris, Texas, US
- Died: December 20, 2009 (aged 71)
- Resting place: Evergreen Cemetery, Paris, Texas
- Occupation: Casting director

Shari Rhodes (July 14, 1938 – December 20, 2009) was an American casting director and producer. Rhodes began her career in the 1970s, working on blockbuster films such as Jaws and Close Encounters of the Third Kind. She co-produced the film The Man in the Moon, which was written by Jenny Wingfield, her close friend. Living in New Mexico, she was the Location Casting Director for shows such as Breaking Bad and In Plain Sight.

Rhodes died on December 20, 2009, from breast cancer. She was featured in the third episode of the third season of Breaking Bad, I.F.T., and was remembered in the credits, with "Dedicated to our friend Shari Rhodes."
