= Cheri Ben-Iesau =

American painter, muralist, author

Cheri Ben-Iesau is an American painter, muralist, author and retired member of the US Coast Guard based in the New Orleans area.

== Biography ==
Born in 1960's Los Angeles and raised in a nomadic California family, she is related, through her father, to the Atlanta artist Frederick Flemister.

Ben-Iesau's work has been exhibited in the Ogden Museum of Southern Art and numerous gallery shows. The U.S. Coast Guard's Hurricane Katrina Memorial, dedicated in a ceremony by DHS Secretary Chertoff on the 1st anniversary of the storm, features one of her murals. You can find her paintings at the New Orleans Veteran's Hospital and in the New Orleans Arts District at Ariodante Contemporary Crafts Gallery. Articles about her art have appeared in Louisiana Homes & Gardens, Professional Mariner, and the Times-Picayune. She is married to Mr. Timothy Thompson of New Orleans.

Ben-Iesau joined the Coast Guard in 1986 to get the G.I. Bill and go back home to college. Her nearly 25-year stint included duty stations in San Diego, Louisville, Baton Rouge, Houston, and New Orleans. When Hurricane Katrina hit, she was detailed as the US Coast Guard liaison to city hall. Her self-published book, "The Long September: the social life of a Katrina responder," describes her experiences leading up to, during, and immediately after the storm. She was Chief of Public and Government Affairs for the Eighth Coast Guard District during the Deepwater Horizon oil spill disaster in 2010, and retired soon after having achieved the rank of Commander.

Her blog and a collection of her paintings may be found at her personal website, ben-iesau.com.
