= Cheri, Iran =

Village in North Khorasan province, Iran

Cheri Persian: چري
- Village
- Location within Iran
- Coordinates: 37°10′18″N 58°09′16″E
- Country: Iran
- Province: North Khorasan
- County: Faruj
- District: Central
- Rural District: Faruj

Population (2016)
  - Total: 2,087
- Time zone: UTC+3:30 (IRST)

Cheri (Persian: چري) (Note: Also romanized as Charī and Cherī) is a village in, and the capital of, Faruj Rural District in the Central District of Faruj County, North Khorasan province, Iran.

== Demographics ==
=== Population ===
At the time of the 2006 National Census, the village's population was 2,090 in 594 households. The following census in 2011 counted 2,147 people in 666 households. The 2016 census measured the population of the village as 2,087 people in 694 households, the most populous in its rural district.
