= Shari Karney =

American lawyer

- Born: Shari Lynn Karney; February 1, 1952 (age 74); Los Angeles County, California, U.S.
- Education: University of California, Los Angeles (BA); Loyola Marymount University (JD)
- Occupations: lawyer, founder of ROAR as ONE, Inc.

Shari Lynn Karney (born February 1, 1952) is an American attorney, incest-survivor activist, and former bar exam preparation company owner.

== Discovering repressed incest ==
While practicing as an attorney in 1983, Shari was asked by a mother to take on a child custody case where the mother thought her 3-year-old daughter was being sexually abused by her ex-husband. While she was questioning the ex-husband on the stand during cross-examination regarding the incest she began to scream and yell and lose control without understanding why. As the witness talked, Shari has claimed she became nauseated and sweaty. She has claimed that she kept hearing the sound of typing in the back of the courtroom, but no one was there. When the witness gave an excuse for touching his daughter's genitals, she screamed, "These men just get away with it!" and leapt into the witness box and tried to strangle him. The judge cited her for contempt, sent her to jail for two days and ordered her into therapy. It was in therapy that she has claimed that she remembered her own childhood molestation by her brother and her father, who was a writer. Shari's brother and father have denied her allegations and "after Louis Karney underwent a series of hypnotic regressions, clinical interviews and personality tests, licensed psychologist James J. Tschudy wrote in a Nov. 24, 1983, report that there was 'abundant and convincing evidence' that [Shari’s father Louis Karney] 'simply could not have engaged in any sexual act with his young daughter or any other child.'" In 1988, Karney stated that she “never actually sued [her] brother and father because [she doesn’t] need the money."

== Incest survivor activism ==
Shari began taking incest survivor cases helping the victims sue their families in civil court to win legal compensation in order to be reimbursed for therapy and other costs. When victims couldn't pay, Shari would finance the suits herself with income from her bar review course, Barwinners. However, Shari found it difficult to win these cases when the courts had a statute of limitations on victims of one year from their 18th birthday to sue.

== Senate Bill 108 ==
From 1985 until 1991 Shari, along with San Francisco attorney Mary R. Williams and California state senator Bill Lockyer, attempted to pass Senate Bill 108. During the Senate hearings, Shari testified to her own molestation by her father and brother. The California law, which amended California Civil Code section 340.1 and took effect January 1, 1991, permits "delayed discovery" of childhood sexual abuse decades after that abuse has occurred. Under the new law the statute of limitations age has been raised to 26 years old. After age 26, a "delayed discovery" provision allows a person who has suppressed their emotional trauma to sue within three years of discovering the abuse. For example, a middle-aged person can now sue his or her elderly parent for sexual trauma caused at age 4, in the same manner as victims of other delayed-discovery injuries, such as asbestos poisoning. Six other states have also passed similar laws.

== Opposition ==
Opponents of SB 108 included California Defense Council, an association of defense lawyers, many of whom are employed by insurers because an abuser's legal fees and some settlement costs would most likely be covered by homeowner insurance policies since most incest occurs in the home.

Some psychologists and therapists of incest survivors see lawsuits as a last resort or capable of causing more damage because it cuts the victim off from the family or because the experience may even compound the victimization based on the difficult burden of proof in a court of law, and the often brutal experience of cross-examination by defense lawyers.

== Shattered Trust: The Shari Karney Story ==
In 1991, NBC bought the rights to her story and developed a movie called Shattered Trust: The Shari Karney Story. The movie was released in 1993 as a television film directed by Bill Corcoran, written by Susan Nanus, and starring Melissa Gilbert.

== Television appearances ==
In 1991 Shari appeared on The Oprah Winfrey Show, Geraldo, Today, Home Show, Larry King Live, and ABC Primetime television programs to educate members of the public about their new legal rights under SB 108.

From 2000-2001 Shari also appeared on the American syndicated TV "court show" Power of Attorney as one of the rotating high-profile attorneys.

== Barwinners ==
In 1981, Karney began tutoring for the California Bar Exam. This would later become a company called Barwinners.

In 2015 Barwinners, was the subject of an "action brought under [The State of California's] Business and Professions Code §17200, for unfair competition, and §17500 of that code, for false advertising"; the Metropolitan News-Enterprise reported that Barwinners settled without admitting wrongdoing. Barwinners is no longer owned or operated by Karney.
