= Sheri Krams =

American immunologist and academic administrator

- Education: University of California, Davis
- Scientific career
- Fields: Immunology and abdominal transplantation
- Workplaces: Stanford University
- Doctoral advisor: M. Eric Gershwin

Sheri Michele Krams is an American immunologist and academic administrator serving as the senior associate dean for graduate education and postdoctoral affairs at Stanford University School of Medicine since 2020. She is a professor of surgery specializing in abdominal transplantation.

== Life ==
Krams earned a Ph.D. in immunology from the University of California, Davis in 1989. Her dissertation is titled, Immune Response to the Mitochondrial Autoantigens of Primary Biliary Cirrhosis. M. Eric Gershwin was her doctoral advisor. She completed postdoctoral research in transplantation at the University of California, San Francisco in 1993.

Krams is a professor of surgery specializing in abdominal transplantation at Stanford University School of Medicine. In 2015, she was elected a fellow of the American Society of Transplantation. In 2020, Krams became the senior associate dean for graduate education and postdoctoral affairs. Krams and Olivia M. Martinez manage the transplantation immunology laboratories.
