= Sherie =

Sherie is an English feminine given name likely inspired by the French chérie, meaning darling (from the past participle of the verb chérir, to cherish). It has also been used as a diminutive of names starting with or containing the sound Cher- or Sher- such as Cherilyn, Cheryl, Sharon, or Sherilyn for females. The name was well-used for girls in North America from the mid-1920s through the early 1990s and was at the height of popularity between the mid-1940s and mid-1970s. Spelling variants of the name such as Cherie, Cherry, Shari, Sheree, Sherrey, Sherri, Sherrie, and Sherry were in vogue during the same time period. Notable people with the name include:

- Sherie Rene Scott (born 1967), American actress, singer, writer, and producer
- Sherie Merlis (born 1972), Malaysian actress

== See also ==
- Sheree
- Sheri
- Sherry (name)
