= Shari Goldhagen =

American author of fiction

Shari Goldhagen is an American author of fiction.

== Biography ==
Goldhagen has been a journalist for National Enquirer, Life & Style, and Celebrity Living Weekly. She has received fellowships from Yaddo, MacDowell, and Ohiana Library Association.

Goldhagen published her first novel Family And Other Accidents (ISBN 0-385-51597-9) in 2006 to mostly positive reviews. Her second novel, In Some Other World, Maybe (ISBN 1-250-04799-4) was published by St. Martin's Press in January 2015. It was selected as an Elle Lettres 2015 Readers' Prize and received a starred Library Journal review. Her third novel, "100 Days of Cake" (ISBN 1481448560) published in 2016 by Atheneum was her first foray into young adult fiction.
