= Cherilyn =

Cherilyn is a feminine given name, an elaboration of the name Cheryl in combination with the suffix -lyn.

Notable people with the name include:

- Cherilyn Elston, British academic and translator
- Cherilyn Mackrory (born 1976), British politician
- Cherilyn Sarkisian (born 1946), American singer and actress known professionally as Cher
- Cherilyn Wilson (born 1988), American actress
- Cherilyn Yazzie, Native American politician, farmer and entrepreneur
