= Sharon =

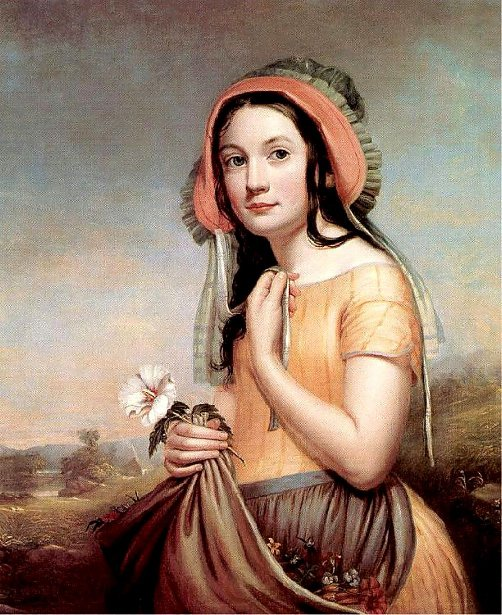
- Rose of Sharon by Shepard Alonzo Mount, 1850.
- Pronunciation: UK: /ˈʃærən/ US: /ˈʃɛrən/ Hebrew: [ʃaːˈʁoːn]
- Gender: Unisex
- Language: English, Hebrew

Origin
- Language: Hebrew
- Origin: שָׁרוֹן, šarŵn
- Meaning: "plain"
- Region of origin: Israel

Other names
- Alternative spelling: Saron
- Related names: Ron, Ronny, Ronnie, Roni, Aaron

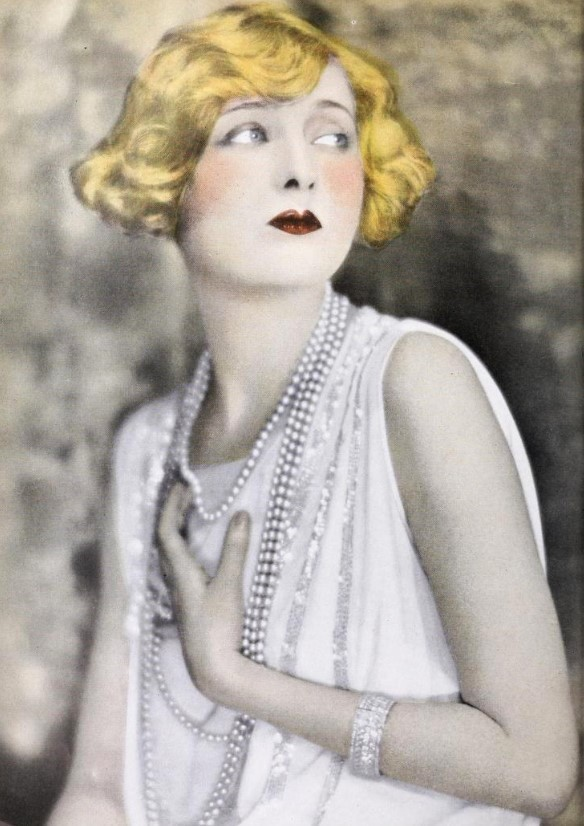
Peggy Hopkins Joyce portrayed Sharon Kimm in the 1926 American film The Skyrocket.

Sharon (Hebrew: שָׁרוֹן Šārôn 'plain'), also spelled Saron, is a given name as well as a Hebrew name.

In English-speaking areas, Sharon is now predominantly a feminine given name, but historically it was also used as a masculine given name. In Israel, it is used as both.

== Etymology ==
The Hebrew word שָׁרוֹן šārôn simply means "plain", as in a flat area of land. But in the Hebrew Bible, שָׁרוֹן Šārôn is the name specifically given to the fertile plain between the Samarian Hills and the coast, known (tautologically) as Sharon plain in English. The further etymology is difficult.

The phrase "rose of Sharon" (חבצלת השרון ḥăḇaṣṣeleṯ ha-sharon) occurs in the KJV translation of the Song of Songs ("I am the rose of Sharon, the lily of the valley"), and has since been used in reference to a number of flowering plants.

Unlike other unisex names that have come to be used almost exclusively as feminine (e.g. Evelyn), Sharon was never predominantly a masculine name. Usage before 1925 is very rare and was apparently inspired either by the Biblical toponym or one of the numerous places in the United States named after the Biblical plain.

== Usage history ==
Use as a feminine name began in the early 20th century, first entering the statistics of the 1,000 most common given names in the United States in 1925. Its inspiration was possibly the heroine of Adela Rogers St. Johns's serial novel The Skyrocket, published in 1925 and made into a romantic drama film starring Peggy Hopkins Joyce in 1926.

The name's popularity in the U.S. steeply increased in the mid-1930s. Sharon peaked during the 1940s and remained a top-10 name for most of that decade. The variant Sharron is on record from the 1930s to the 1970s. Its peak popularity in the U.S. was in 1943. The more eccentric spelling Sharyn was popular for a brief time in the 1940s and peaked in 1945.

The name's popularity has steadily declined since the 1940s, except for a slight rise in the late 1950s. It fell out of the top 100 after 1977, out of the top 500 after 2001, and out of the top 1,000 names for American girls after 2016.

In the United Kingdom, its popularity peaked during the 1960s. It was the 10th most popular female name by 1964 and was still as high as 17th in 1974 (when it was 70th in the U.S.), but a sharp decline in popularity followed. Since the 1980s, the name has not been in the top 100. Names that rhyme with Sharon, such as Darren and Karen, were also popular in the Anglosphere during the same period.

In the 1980s, Sharon was stereotyped as a "chav" name in the United Kingdom, signifying a working-class teenage girl who works in a supermarket. By the 2010s, the name had become associated with memes poking fun at overbearing middle-aged women who complain to authority figures. The demeaning stereotype has been attributed to sexism and age discrimination and caused difficulty for women named Sharon.

While appearing on the BBC's Celebrity Mastermind, contestant Amanda Henderson was asked to name the Swedish teenage climate activist who wrote a book titled No One's Too Small to Make a Difference. Henderson answered, "Sharon". After the broadcast, climate activist Greta Thunberg (the correct response to the question) changed her name to Sharon on her Twitter bio (which remained there for the day: 3 January 2020).

== People with the given name ==
=== Feminine given name ===
- Sharon Aguilar (born 1986), American multi-instrumentalist, singer, and songwriter.
- Sharon Azrieli, Canadian singer and cantor
- Sharon Barker (1949–2023), Canadian-American women's rights activist, advocate, and feminist
- Sharon Beasley-Teague (born 1952), American politician
- Sharon Begley (1956–2021), American journalist
- Saron Berhe (born 2007), Ethiopian middle-distance runner
- Sharon Berry, British charity founder
- Sharon Bird (born 1962), Australian politician
- Sharon Blady, Canadian politician
- Sharon Block, several people
- Sharon Bowles (born 1953), British politician
- Sharon Bridgforth (born 1958), American writer
- Sharon Bruneau (born 1964), Canadian female bodybuilder and fitness competitor
- Sharon Dahlonega Raiford Bush (born 1952), American TV personality
- Sharon Butler (born 1959), American artist and arts writer
- Sharon Calahan, American cinematographer
- Sharon Campbell, British diplomat
- Sharon Carr (born 1979), Belizean-British murderer
- Sharon Case (born 1971), American actress
- Sharon Chan (born 1979), Hong Kong actress and model
- Sharon Cheslow (born 1961), American singer-songwriter and artist
- Sharon Cheung, Hong Kong journalist and entrepreneur
- Sharon Cherop (born 1984), Kenyan long-distance runner
- Sharon Chirwa, Malawian author and television personality
- Sharon Choi (born 1994/1995), Korean-American interpreter and filmmaker
- Sharon Christian (1950–2015), Canadian artist
- Sharon Church (1948–2022), American studio jeweler, metalsmith, and educator
- Sharon D. Clarke (born 1966), English actress and singer
- Sharon Claydon (born 1964), Australian politician
- Sharon Cohen (born 1972), more commonly known as Dana International, an Israeli pop singer
- Sharon Core (born 1965), American artist and photographer
- Sharon Corr (born 1970), Irish musician and member of The Corrs
- Sharon Creech (born 1945), author of children's books Walk Two Moons and Ruby Holler
- Sharon Cuneta (born 1966), Filipina actress and host of the Sharon talk show
- Sharon Davis, several people
- Sharon Day-Monroe (born 1985), American heptathlete, pentathlete and high jumper
- Sharon den Adel (born 1974), co-founder of and singer for Dutch symphonic metal band Within Temptation
- Sharon Dijksma (born 1971), Dutch politician
- Sharon Doorson (born 1987), Dutch singer
- Sharon M. Draper (born 1948), American children's writer, educator, and teacher
- Sharon Dyall (born 1962), Swedish singer, actress and voice actress
- Sharon Epperson (born 1968), CNBC correspondent
- Sharon Eubank (born 1963), American director of Latter-day Saint Charities
- Sharon Farrell (1940–2023), American actress and dancer
- Sharon Fichman (born 1990), Canadian/Israeli tennis player
- Sharon Finneran (born 1946), American swimmer
- Sharon Frost, American politician
- Sharon Lee Gallegos (1955–1960), American murder victim
- Sharon Gibson (born 1961), English javelin thrower
- Sharon Gless (born 1943), American actress
- Sharon Gold (born 1949), American artist
- Sharon Green (1942–2022), American author
- Sharon Dee Vermilyea Hague (born 1968), German American Buyer
- Sharon Hampson (born 1943), Canadian singer
- Sharon Hanson (born 1965), American heptathlete
- Sharon Hartwell, Canadian politician
- Sharon Hayes (politician) (born 1948), Canadian politician
- Sharon Hodgson (born 1966), British politician
- Sharon Horgan (born 1970), Irish comedy writer
- Sharon Hugueny (1944–1996), American actress
- Sharon Jaklofsky (born 1968), Australian-Dutch athlete
- Sharon Jansen, New Zealand architect
- Sharon Jones (1956–2016), American singer
- Sharon Jordan (born 1960), American film and television actress
- Sharon Kantor (born 2003), Israeli world champion windsurfer
- Sharon Keller (born 1953), American judge
- Sharon Kinne (born 1939), American fugitive
- Sharon Kips (born 1983), Dutch singer
- Sharon Kleinbaum (born 1959), American rabbi
- Saron Läänmäe, Estonian footballer
- Sharon Lawrence (born 1961), American television actress
- Sharon Leal (born 1972), American actress and director
- Sharon Lee, several people
- Sharon G. Lee (born 1952), American judge
- Sharon Letlape, South African politician
- Sharon Lohr, American statistician
- Sharon Garcia Magdayao (born 1975), known professionally as Vina Morales, Filipina actress and singer
- Sharon Maguire (born 1960), British film director
- Sharon Menzies, New Zealand financier
- Sharon Lee Myers (born 1941), stage name Jackie DeShannon, American singer
- Sharon Needles (born 1981), American drag queen and winner of RuPaul's Drag Race season 4
- Sharon Nesmith (born 1969/70), Brigadier of the British Army
- Sharon Olds (born 1942), American poet
- Sharon O'Neill (born 1952), New Zealand singer-songwriter and pianist
- Sharon Osbourne (born 1952), English music promoter and TV personality, wife and manager of Ozzy Osbourne
- Sharon Pratt (born 1944), American politician and attorney
- Sharron Prior (died 1975), Canadian murder victim
- Sharon Que (born 1960), American artist
- Sharon Quirk-Silva (born 1962), American politician
- Sharon Redd (1945–1992), American singer
- Sharon Rendle (born 1966), British judoka
- Sharon Rooney (born 1988), Scottish actress
- Sharon Shannon (born 1968), Irish musician
- Sharon Shapiro, American gymnast
- Sharon Shaw (1957–1971), American murder victim
- Sharon Slater, Irish historian
- Sharon Hartman Strom, American historian
- Sharon Alaina Stephen (born 1987), Malaysian actress
- Sharon Stone (born 1958), American actress, model and producer
- Sharon Tate (1943–1969), American actress
- Sharon Tyler Herbst (1942–2007), American chef and author
- Sharon Tyler, American politician
- Sharon Van Etten (born 1981), American singer-songwriter
- Sharon Vazanna (born 1982), Israeli choreographer, dancer, and teacher
- Sharon Waxman (born c.1963), American journalist
- Sharon Weston Broome (born 1956), American politician
- Sharon Witherspoon, British statistician
- Sharon White (born 1967), British businesswoman and civil servant
- Sharon Yaish, Israeli film director
- Sharon Zukin (born 1946), American academic
- Sharon Zukowski (1954/55–2015), American mystery novelist

=== Masculine given name ===
- Sharon Afek (born 1970), Israeli general
- Sharon Drucker (born 1967), Israeli professional basketball coach
- Sharon Rotbard (born 1959), Israeli architect publisher and author
- Sharon Shason (born 1979), retired Israeli basketball player
- Sharon Turner (1768–1847), English historian
- Sharon Tyndale (1816–1871), American politician
- Sharon Yaari (born 1966), Israeli photographer
- Arthur Saron Sarnoff, American artist and illustrator

== People with the surname ==
Sharon was adopted as a surname by Zionist emigrants in the context of the Hebrew revival in the early 20th century, and has since become a heritable Israeli surname.

- Arieh Sharon (born Ludwig Kurzmann, 1900–1984), Israeli architect
- Ariel Sharon (born Ariel Scheinermann, 1928–2014), Israeli prime minister. David Ben-Gurion gave him the surname "Sharon" in c. 1948.
- Avraham Sharon (born Abraham Schwadron, 1878–1957), Israeli intellectual
- Carma Sharon, Australian actress, director, and producer
- Gus Saron, South African activist
- Moshe Sharon (born 1937), Israeli scholar of Islamic history and civilization, author i.a. of the Corpus Inscriptionum Arabicarum Palaestinae, a work in progress planned to contain all ancient Arabic inscriptions found in the Holy Land
- Omri Sharon (born 1964), Israeli politician, son of Ariel Sharon
- Revital Sharon (born 1970), Israeli Olympic artistic gymnast
- Tomer Sharon (born 1970), Israeli actor, stand-up comedian and singer
- Tuot Saron, Cambodian politician
- Yuval Sharon, American stage director

=== Pseudonym ===
- Deke Sharon, stage name of Kurk Richard Toohey (born 1967), American singer, musician, producer

== Fictional characters ==
- Sharon (シャロン), a character from the Street Fighter EX series
- Sharon, a character in the 1981 American made-for-television movie Fallen Angel
- Sharon, a character in the 2001 American made-for-television drama movie A Girl Thing
- Sharon, a character in the 2022 American drama The Listener
- Sharon Baker, a character in the 2015 American comedy-drama movie The Breakup Girl
- Sharon Bates, a character in the 2002 American comedy Hollywood Ending
- Sharon Benson, in Argentine Disney Channel telenovela Soy Luna
- Sharon Carter, a Marvel Comics character
- Sharon Charles, main character of the 2009 film Obsessed
- Sharon Collins Newman, a character in the daytime soap opera The Young and The Restless
- Sharon Cooper, a character in the 1982 musical film Grease 2
- Sharon Davies, a character in the Australian soap opera Neighbours
- Sharon, a Doctor Who magazine character
- Dr. Sharon Gill, a character in the 2014 American comedy-drama movie The Angriest Man in Brooklyn
- Sharon Jellinsky, a minor character in the film Addams Family Values
- Sharon Kaneko, a supporting character in the anime and manga series Space Brothers
- Sharon Koy, a character in the Chinese web novel Lord of Mysteries
- Sharon Marsh, Stan Marsh's mom on South Park
- Sharon McGee, a character from The Ghost and Molly McGee
- Sharon McKendrick, one of the two main characters in the 1961 American romantic comedy The Parent Trap
- Sharon Newman, fictional character from The Young and the Restless
- Sharon Norbury, in Mean Girls
- Sharon Potter, a character on the American TV sitcom Get a Life (1990–1992)
- Sharon Rainworth, a character in the manga and anime series Pandora Hearts
- Sharon Smith (Catseye), a Marvel Comics character
- Sharon Esther Spitz, the protagonist of the Canadian animated TV series Braceface
- Sharon Strzelecki, a character from Kath & Kim
- Sharon Valerii, a character from Battlestar Galactica
- Rose of Sharon Joad Rivers, a character from The Grapes of Wrath
- Sharon Rai Prakash, a character from the Indian series Dil Dosti Dance
- Sharon Watts, a character from the British soap opera EastEnders

== See also ==
- Sharen Gravelle, American woman indicted for child abuse
- Sharen Jester Turney (born 1956), American global business leader

== Placenames ==
- Sharon, Ontario, Canada
- Sharon, Connecticut
- Sharonville, Ohio
- Sharon, Pennsylvania
- Sharon Springs, New York
- Sharon Springs, Kansas
- Sharon, Massachusetts
- Sharon, New Jersey
- Sharon, Vermont
- Sharon, South Carolina
- Sharon, Georgia
- Sharon, North Dakota
- Sharon, Queensland, Australia
