= Sherrie =

Sherrie is an English female given name. It might come from the French chérie, meaning darling (from the past participle of the verb chérir, to cherish).

It may refer to:

- Sherrie Hewson (born 1950), English actress
- Sherrie Levine (born 1947), photographer and conceptual artist
- Sherrie Rollins Westin, Executive Vice President and Chief Marketing Officer of Sesame Workshop
- Sherrie Schneider, author
- Sherrie Eugene (born 1964), English TV presenter

== See also ==
- Chéri (disambiguation)
- Cheri (disambiguation)
- Cherie
- Cherri (disambiguation)
- Cherrie
- Cherry (disambiguation)
- Shari (disambiguation)
- Sheri (disambiguation)
- Sherie
- Sherri (name)
- Sherry (disambiguation)
- Shery
