= Cherri =

Cherri may refer to:

- Agustina Cherri, Argentine actress
- Ali Cherri, Lebanese artist
- Cherri Gilham, British actress
- Cherri M. Pancake, American academic
