= Sherilyn =

Sherilyn is an English feminine given name, an elaboration of the name Cheryl or Sheryl in combination with the suffix -lyn.

It may refer to:

- Sherilyn Dunstall, the pen name used by Australian sisters Sherylyn and Karen Dunstall
- Sherilyn Fenn (born 1965), American actress and author
- Sherilyn C. Fritz, researcher into paleoclimate and paleoecology
- Sherilyn Peace Garnett (born 1969), American attorney, judge of the Los Angeles County Superior Court
- Sherilyn McCoy or Sheri McCoy (born 1959), American scientist and business executive
- Sherilyn Reyes-Tan (born 1975), Filipina actress
- Melinda Sherilyn Wang (born 1990), Taiwanese-American figure skater
- Sherilyn Williams-Stroud, geologist
- Sherilyn Wolter (born 1951), American former actress

== See also ==
- Cheryl Lynn
- Sherry Lynn
