= Sheri =

Sheri may refer to:

- Sheri (given name), a feminine given name, including a list of persons bearing it
- Shamsher Singh Sheri (1942–2005), a communist leader in India
- Sharia, known as شرع Şeriʿ in Ottoman Turkish
- Sheri (社日), Chinese festivals honoring Tudishen
  - Chunshe, celebrated in spring
  - Qiushe (秋社), celebrated in fall
