= Cherry (given name) =

Cherry is a given name with multiple origins. In some instances, the given name is a transferred use of the surname Cherry. In other instances, the name was given in reference to the fruit. In other instances, it was an English version of the French term of endearment chérie.

It may refer to:

== Women ==
- Cherry (athlete) (born 1973), Burmese Olympic hurdler
- Cherry Chevapravatdumrong (born 1977), American screenwriter
- Cherry Hood (born 1960), Australian artist
- Cherry Jones (born 1956), American actress
- Cherry Lou (born 1982), Filipina actress
- Cherry Mardia, Indian actress
- Cherry Marshall (1923–2006), British fashion model and agent
- Cherry Pie Picache (born 1970), Filipina actress
- Cherry "Sisi" Rondina (born 1996), Filipino volleyball player
- Cherry Smith (1943–2008), American vocalist
- Cherry Wainer (1935–2014), South African musician
- Cherry Wilder (1930–2002), New Zealand writer

== Men ==
- Cherry DeLefebvre (1835–?), American businessman
- Cherry Logan Emerson (engineer) (1888–1959), American engineer and academic administrator
- Cherry Logan Emerson (chemist) (1916–2007), American chemical engineer, businessman, and philanthropist
- Cherry Ingram (1880–1981), British ornithologist, plant collector, and gardener
- Cherry Kearton (1871–1940), British photographer
- Cherry Pillman (1890–1955), English rugby union player
- Cherry Sor.Wanich (born 1969), Thai professional muay thai fighter

== Fiction ==
- Cherry Valance, a character from the 1967 novel The Outsiders

== See also ==
- Cherry (disambiguation)
