= Sherrey =

Indian film director and screenwriter

- Born: Sherrey; 1972 or 1973 (age 52–53); Kannur
- Occupations: Film director, Screenwriter
- Notable work: Adimadhyantham
- Awards: National Film Award – Special Mention (Feature Film) (2012)

Sherrey is an Indian film director and screenwriter who works in Malayalam films. He has directed several short films, but is known for his debut feature film Adimadhyantham which won a special reference in the 59th National Film Awards., and was the only Malayalam film selected to compete in the 16th International Film Festival of Kerala.

== Filmography ==
- Adimadhyantham (2011)
