= Shery =

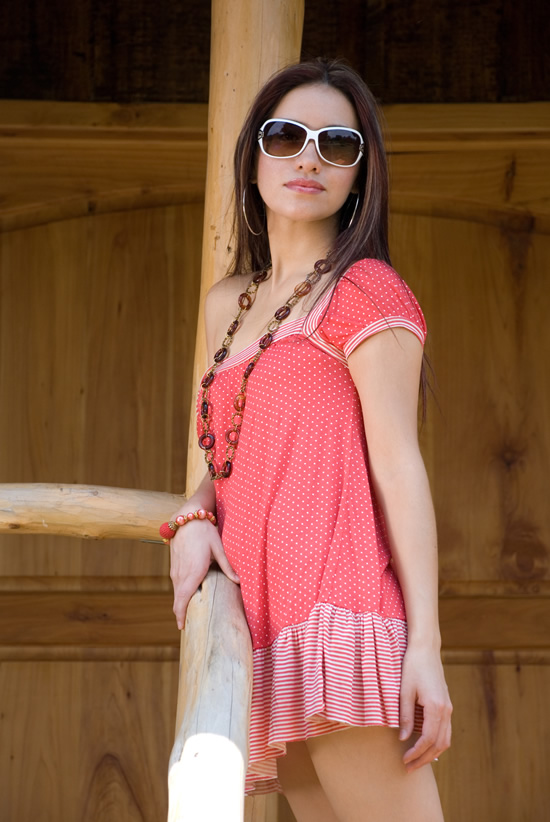
- Shery in 2008

Background information
- Born: August 18, 1985 (age 40); Guatemala City, Guatemala
- Genres: Latin pop, Pop rock, pop
- Instrument: Vocals
- Years active: 2005-Present
- Label: Creatorium Music
- Website: Shery.net

Shery (born August 18, 1985) is a Guatemalan Latin pop singer and songwriter. She has recorded songs in Spanish and Italian, and shared stage with such international superstars as Chayanne, Cristian Castro, Manuel Mijares, Miguel Bosé, Enrique Iglesias, Vikki Carr and Aleks Syntek. Two of her original compositions (namely "El amor es un fantasma" and "En la vida y para siempre") have been finalists in the John Lennon Songwriting Contest, in New York City.

"El amor es un fantasma" ("Love is a Ghost"), her first album, was released in January 2008 after two and a half years of production. The CD is named after the first song ever written by the artist, which debuted in radio with 26 straight weeks in the Top 40 in her natal Guatemala in 2005.

The album features 11 original songs written by Shery, a song written by legendary Spanish songwriter José Luis Perales, as well as duets with Italian producer / songwriter Francesco Sondelli, Guatemalan singer Jorge "El Bardo" and another with Cuban-American vocalist Daniel René, former member of Latin Pop band Menudo / MDO. The album includes a track mixed by Eddie Kramer, who has produced for Led Zeppelin, Jimi Hendrix, Kiss, The Rolling Stones, Joe Cocker and David Bowie.

In 2011 she released "Uno solo en este juego", a pop/rock song featuring el Bardo. The official videoclip, which features a real racing car and 3D animation effects, was directed by Jimmy Lemus and Leonel Álvarez.

== Videoclips ==
- 2011: Me converti en roca
- 2011: Uno solo en este juego
- 2006: Libre

== Number 1 National Radio Hits (Guatemala) ==
- 2011: Uno solo en este juego
- 2008: En la vida y para siempre
- 2007: El Amor (duet with Daniel René)
- 2006: Me converti en roca
- 2006: Todo se termina aqui
- 2005: El amor es un fantasma

== Discography ==
=== Singles ===
- 2011: Me converti en roca
  - Me converti en roca (electro-pop)
  - Me converti en roca (banda)
  - Me converti en roca (ballad)
  - Me converti en roca (instrumental / karaoke)
  - El sol esperara
- 2011: Uno solo en este juego
  - Uno solo en este juego (feat. el Bardo)
  - Uno solo en este juego (solo version)
  - Uno solo en este juego (Rafa midnight mix)
  - Uno solo en este juego (Instrumental / sing along track)
- 2008: En la vida y para siempre
  - En la vida y para siempre (radio cut)
  - En la vida y para siempre (album version)
- 2007: El amor
  - El amor (duet with Daniel René)
  - Todo se termina aqui
- 2006: Me converti en roca
  - Me converti en roca
  - Me converti en roca (extended version)
- 2005: El amor es un fantasma (single/sencillo)
  - El amor es un fantasma
  - Libre

=== Albums ===
- 2008: El amor es un fantasma
  - En la vida y para siempre
  - Nos desgarramos el alma
  - Muerteamor
  - Cuatro paredes
  - El amor (duet with Daniel René)
  - Uno solo en este juego (duet with "El Bardo")
  - Me convertí en roca
  - El amor es un fantasma
  - Continuamente (duet with Francesco Sondelli)
  - Libre
  - Mis lágrimas
  - Todo se termina aquí
  - El suspiro se me va (feat. Francesco Sondelli)
