= Cherry (disambiguation) =

The cherry is the fruit of many plants of the genus Prunus. The plants themselves are also called cherries, and the wood they produce is called cherry.

Cherry may also refer to:

== Plants and fruits ==
- Cherry, Bourreria baccata (family Boraginaceae), native to the Americas
- Cherry, the fruit of the coffee tree, Coffea
- Barbados cherry or acerola, Malpighia glabra (family Malpighiaceae) and its fruit
- Jamaica cherry, ornamental cherry, Singapore cherry, West Indian cherry, Muntingia calabura (family Muntingiaceae) and its fruit
- Jerusalem cherry, Solanum pseudocapsicum (family Solanaceae)
- Various species of Eugenia (family Myrtaceae), including:
  - Brazil cherry, Eugenia brasiliensis
  - Surinam cherry or Brazil cherry, Eugenia uniflora
- Various species of Exocarpos (family Santalaceae), native to south-east Asia, Australia, and the Pacific, including:
  - Exocarpos cupressiformis Labill., cherry ballart, cypress cherry
  - Exocarpos latifolius R.Br., broad-leaved cherry
  - Exocarpos sparteus R.Br., slender cherry
  - Exocarpos strictus R.Br., dwarf cherry
- Various species of Pseudolmedia glabrata (family Moraceae)
- Various species of Syzygium (family Myrtaceae), including:
  - Syzygium aqueum, water cherry
  - Syzygium australe, brush cherry (Australia)
  - Syzygium corynanthum, sour cherry
  - Syzygium crebrinerve, purple cherry
  - Syzygium luehmannii, cherry satinash
  - Syzygium paniculatum, magenta cherry (Australia)

== Places ==
=== United States ===
- Cherry, Arizona, a mining ghost town
- Cherry, Illinois, a village
- Cherry, Minnesota, an unincorporated community
- Cherry, Tennessee, an unincorporated community
- Cherry, West Virginia, an unincorporated community
- Cherry County, Nebraska
- Cherry Lake, an artificial lake in the Stanislaus National Forest of Tuolumne County, California

=== Multiple locations ===
- Cherry Creek (disambiguation)
- Cherry Gardens (disambiguation)
- Cherry Island (disambiguation)
- Cherry River (disambiguation)
- Cherry Street (disambiguation)
- Cherry Township (disambiguation)

== People ==
- Cherry (given name)
- Cherry (surname)
- Cherry (athlete) (born 1973), Burmese Olympic hurdler
- Cherry (American wrestler), a ring name of professional wrestler Kara Drew (born 1975)
- Cherry (Japanese wrestler), a ring name of a Japanese professional wrestler (born 1974)
- Ram Charan (born 1985), Indian actor also known as "Cherry" or "Cherry Tej"
- Arnaldo Sentimenti (1914–1997), Italian football player and coach nicknamed "Cherry"
- Cherry Vanilla, stage name of American singer Kathleen Dorritie (born 1943)

== Arts and entertainment ==
=== Fictional characters ===
- Cherry (Urusei Yatsura), in the Japanese manga series Urusei Yatsura
- Cherry Ames, in a series of novels by Helen Wells and Julie Campbell Tatham
- Cherry Clay, in the British soap opera Doctors
- Cherry Seinfeld, from The Thundermans
- Cherry Darling, in the 2007 film Grindhouse.
- Cherry Valance, in the 1967 novel The Outsiders
- Chubby Cherry (also known as simply Cherry), animated lead singer of the virtual band Studio Killers

=== Film and television ===
- Cherry (2010 film), an American comedy
- About Cherry, a 2012 American drama film about the porn industry originally titled Cherry
- Cherry (2021 film), a crime drama
- "Cherry" (The Boys), a 2019 episode of The Boys
- Cherries (film), a 2022 Lithuanian short film
- Cherry (2023 film), a Canadian short documentary

=== Music ===
==== Groups ====
- Cherry (band), a 1990s Australian girl group
- Cherry, former name of American music duo Ratatat

==== Albums and EPs ====
- Cherry (EP), a 1991 EP by Curve
- Cherry (Daphni album), 2022
- Cherry (Jimmy McGriff album), 1966
- Cherry (Lisa Shaw album), 2005
- Cherry (Shit and Shine album), 2008
- Cherry (Stanley Turrentine album), 1972

==== Songs ====
- "Cherry" (jazz standard), a 1928 song composed by Don Redman and Ray Gilbert
- "Cherry, Cherry", a 1966 song written and recorded by Neil Diamond
- "Cherry" (Yui song), "C.H.E.R.R.Y.", a 2007 Japanese song by Yui
- "Cherry", a 2012 song by Chromatics
- "Cherry", a 2017 song by Lana Del Rey from Lust for Life
- "Cherry", a 2018 song by Rina Sawayama
- "Cherry", a 2019 song by Itzy from their debut album It'z Icy
- "Cherry", a 2019 song by Harry Styles from Fine Line

=== Other arts and entertainment ===
- Cherry (comics), adult comic book series
- Cherry (painting), a 1969 painting by Russian artist Evsey E. Moiseenko
- Cherry (novel), a 2018 novel by Nico Walker
- Double Cherry, a power-up in Super Mario 3D World

== Business ==
- Cherry (brand), a Philippine mobile phone and consumer electronics brand
- Cherry AG, a German computer peripheral-device maker
- Cherry Red Airline, also known as the Cherry Air Service, first airline in Prince Albert, Saskatchewan, Canada
- Nissan Cherry, a Japanese automobile model
- SM Cherry, Philippine supermall brand

== Other uses ==
- The Cherries, nickname of English football team AFC Bournemouth

== See also ==
- Cherie, a given name
- Cherrie, a given and surname
- Cerise (disambiguation)
- Chery (disambiguation)
- Cherry red (disambiguation)
- Red cherry (disambiguation)
