= Cherry (surname) =

Cherry is an English surname. Notable people with the surname include:

- Blair Cherry (1901–1966), American baseball and football coach
- Bobby Frank Cherry (1930–2004), American terrorist and klansman
- Byron Cherry (born 1955), American actor
- Caroline Janice Cherry (born 1942), American science fiction author, who writes under the nom de plume C.J. Cherryh
- Célena Cherry (born 1977), British singer
- Chloe Cherry (born 1997), American actress
- Colin Cherry (1914–1979), British cognitive scientist
- Daly Cherry-Evans (born 1989), Australian Rugby League player
- Don Cherry (disambiguation), multiple people
  - Don Cherry (born 1934), Canadian hockey player and broadcaster
- E. Daniel Cherry (born 1939), a brigadier general and command pilot in the U.S. Air Force who served in the Vietnam War
- Eagle-Eye Cherry (born 1971), Swedish-born American musician
- Francis Cherry (disambiguation)
- Fred Cherry (1926–2003), American activist
- Fred V. Cherry (1928–2018), a colonel and command pilot in the U.S. Air Force who served in the Korean War, the Cold War, and the Vietnam War
- Gladys Cherry (1881–1965), British Titanic survivor
- Gregg Cherry (1891–1957), American politician
- Helen Cherry (1915–2001), British actress
- Henry P. Cherry (1823–1895), Michigan politician
- Jake Cherry (born 1996), American actor
- Joanna Cherry (born 1966), Scottish politician
- John Cherry (disambiguation)
- Karsyn Cherry
- Kathryn E. Cherry (1880–1931), American impressionist painter and educator
- Kelly Cherry (1940–2022), American writer
- Kittredge Cherry, American writer and priest
- Lynne Cherry (born 1952), American writer
- Marc Cherry (born 1962), American writer and producer
- Merrie Cherry, American drag queen
- Neneh Cherry (born 1964), Swedish musician
- Sara Cherry, American microbiologist
- Simon Cherry, American biomedical engineer
- Travis Cherry (born 1975), American musician
- Trevor Cherry (1948–2020), English football player
- Tyler Cherry, American political appointee
- Wal Cherry (1932–1986), Australian drama scholar and theatre director
- Wayne Cherry (born 1937), American car designer
- Zach Cherry (born 1987), American actor and improv comedian

== See also ==
- Apsley Cherry-Garrard (1886–1959), British explorer
- Cherry (disambiguation)
