= Cerise =

Cerise may refer to:

- The French word for cherry, a fruit
- Cerise (grape), an Argentinian wine grape
- Cerise (color), a deep to vivid pinkish red

== Places ==
- Cerisé, Orne, France; a commune
- Cerise Creek, Nlháxten/Cerise Creek Conservancy, Pemberton, British Columbia, Canada; a creek
- Millers Island (also called Cerise Island), White Bay, Newfoundland, Newfoundland and Labrador, Canada; an island

== People ==
=== Given name ===
- Cerise Castle, American journalist
- Cerise Lim Jacobs, stagewriter

=== Surname ===
- Giuseppe Cerise, Italian luger
- Laurent Cerise (1807–1869), French medical doctor

=== Fictional characters ===
- Cerise (comics), a fictional character from Marvel Comics
- Queue-de-Cerise, a fictional secretary from the French comic strip Gil Jourdan
- Cerise (シェリス, Sherisu), a fictional character from the videogame Rockman EXE Legend of Network
- Professor Cerise, a character in the Pokémon anime
- Cerise Hood, the daughter of Little Red Riding Hood in the Mattel doll franchise Ever After High
- Cerise Martin, a fictional character from the Balefire (novel series) by Cate Tiernan
- Cerise Bianca, the new identity of Lila Rossi and the main season 6 antagonist in the French series Miraculous: Tales of Ladybug & Cat Noir
- Cerise, a character in the videogame Marvel's Avengers (video game)

== Other uses ==
- Cerise (satellite), military reconnaissance satellite of France
- La Cerise (album), a 2007 album by Matmatah
- Cerise by Gordon Ramsay, a restaurant in Tokyo; see List of restaurants owned or operated by Gordon Ramsay
- Cerise Press, a French publisher founded by Fiona Sze-Lorrain

== See also ==
- Cherry (disambiguation)
- Cherry red (disambiguation)
- Red cherry (disambiguation)
- C series (disambiguation)
