= Henry Cherry =

Henry Cherry may refer to:

- Henry Hardin Cherry (1864–1937), leader in Kentucky higher education
- Henry C. Cherry, politician in North Carolina
- Henry P. Cherry (1823–1895), Michigan politician
