= Chery (disambiguation) =

Chery is a Chinese automobile manufacturer.

Chery or Chéry may also refer to:

- Chery (surname)
- Chéry, a commune in the Cher département of the Centre region of France
- Mont Chéry, a mountain in the Chablais Alps in Haute-Savoie, France

== See also ==
- Chéry-Chartreuve, a commune in the Aisne department in Picardy in northern France
- Chéry-lès-Pouilly, a commune in the Aisne department in Picardy in northern France
- Chéry-lès-Rozoy, a commune in the Aisne department in Picardy in northern France
- Cherie
- Cherry (disambiguation)
- Cheryl (disambiguation)
