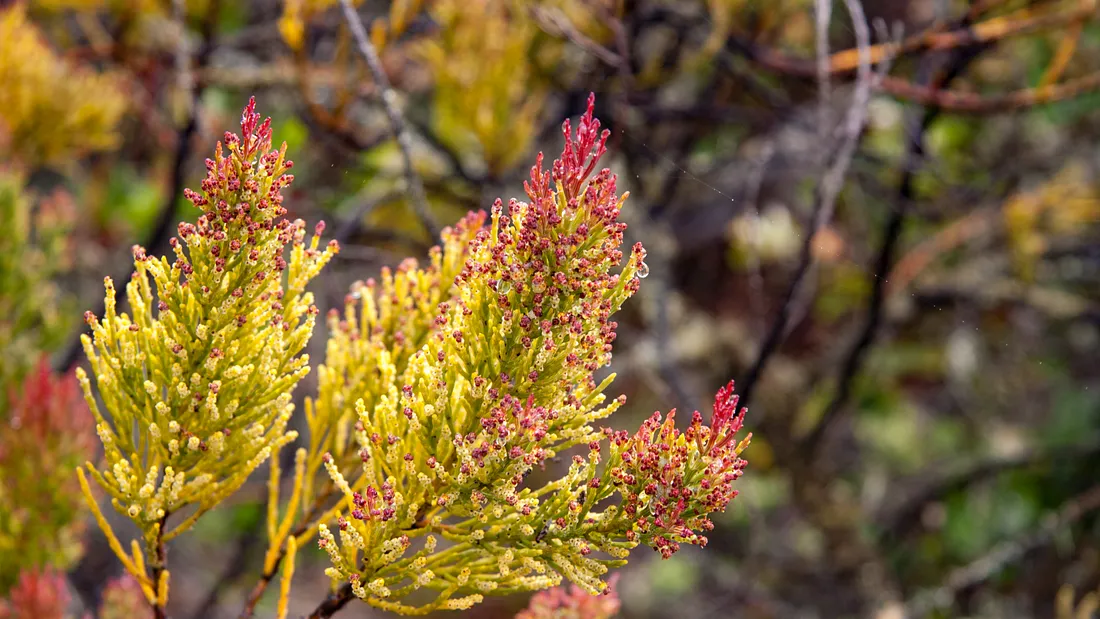

Conservation status
- Imperiled (NatureServe)

Scientific classification
- Kingdom: Plantae
- Clade: Tracheophytes
- Clade: Angiosperms
- Clade: Eudicots
- Order: Santalales
- Family: Santalaceae
- Genus: Exocarpos
- Species: E. menziesii

Binomial name
- Exocarpos menziesii Stauffer (1959)
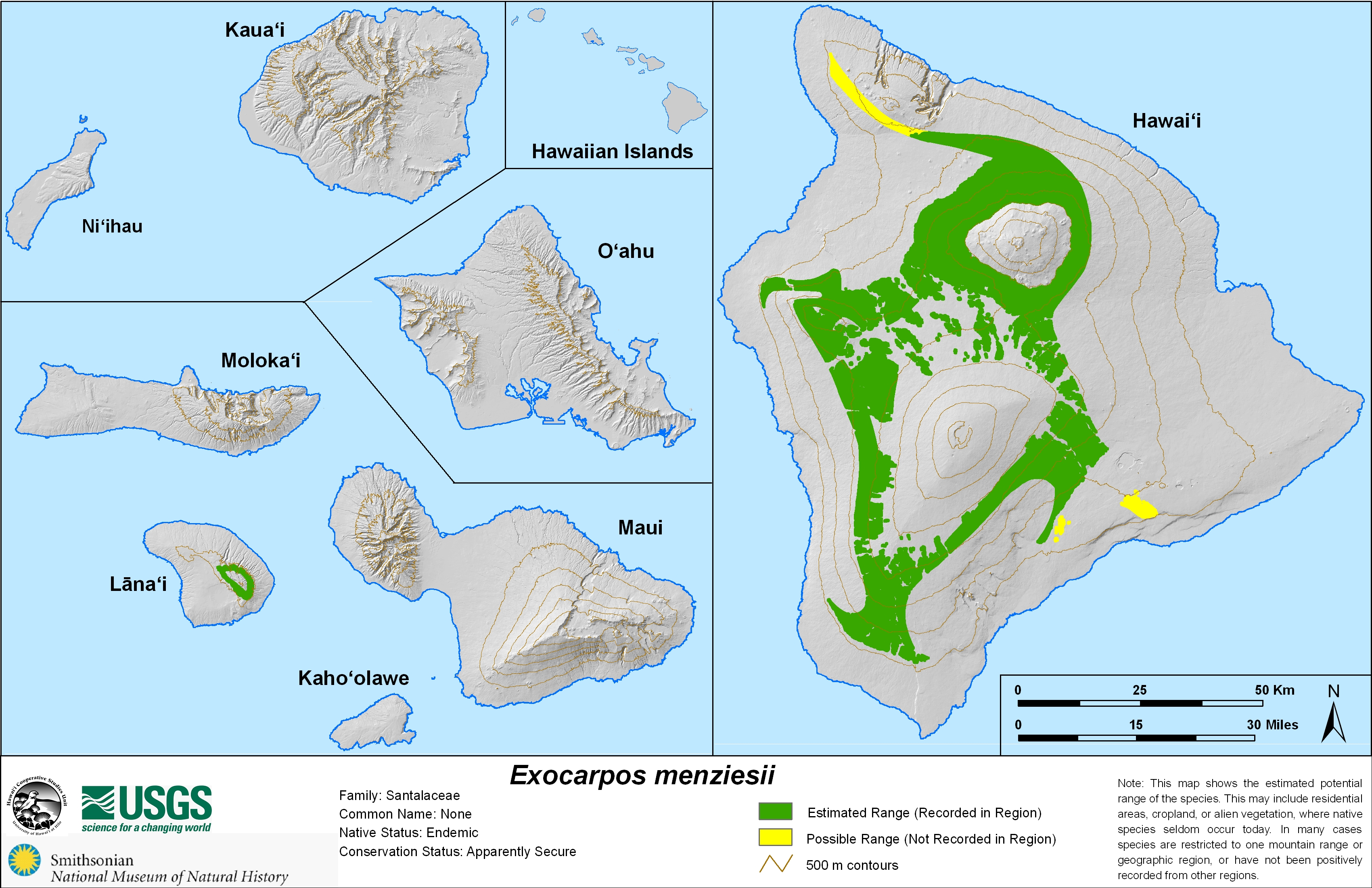
- Range map Hawaii

= Exocarpos menziesii =

Species of plant

Exocarpos menziesii, also known as heau, is an endangered rare Hawaiian native plant in the Santalaceae family. The genus Exocarpos contains shrubs and small trees whose roots are semi-parasitic in that they will attach themselves to other plants. This genus is distributed through South-East Asia, Pacific Islands and Australia.

== Description ==
Exocarpos menziesii is a shrub that can grow up to 2 m (6 ft 7 in) in height. Characteristics include maroon-tipped stems with dense branching, leaves that resemble scales, and can sometimes be oblanceolate and elliptic. These leaves grow to be 10 to 14 mm (3/8 to 9/16 in) long and 3 to 6 mm (1/8 to 1/4 in) wide and are shaped like wedges or a tapering stemless base. E. menziesii has perfect flowers with five 3 mm (1/8 in) long red petals. The fruits are fleshy with one seed and are shades of reddish brown and red when mature. They are 7 to 10 mm (1/4 to 3/8 in) long and have an ellipsoid to ovoid shape.

== Etymology ==
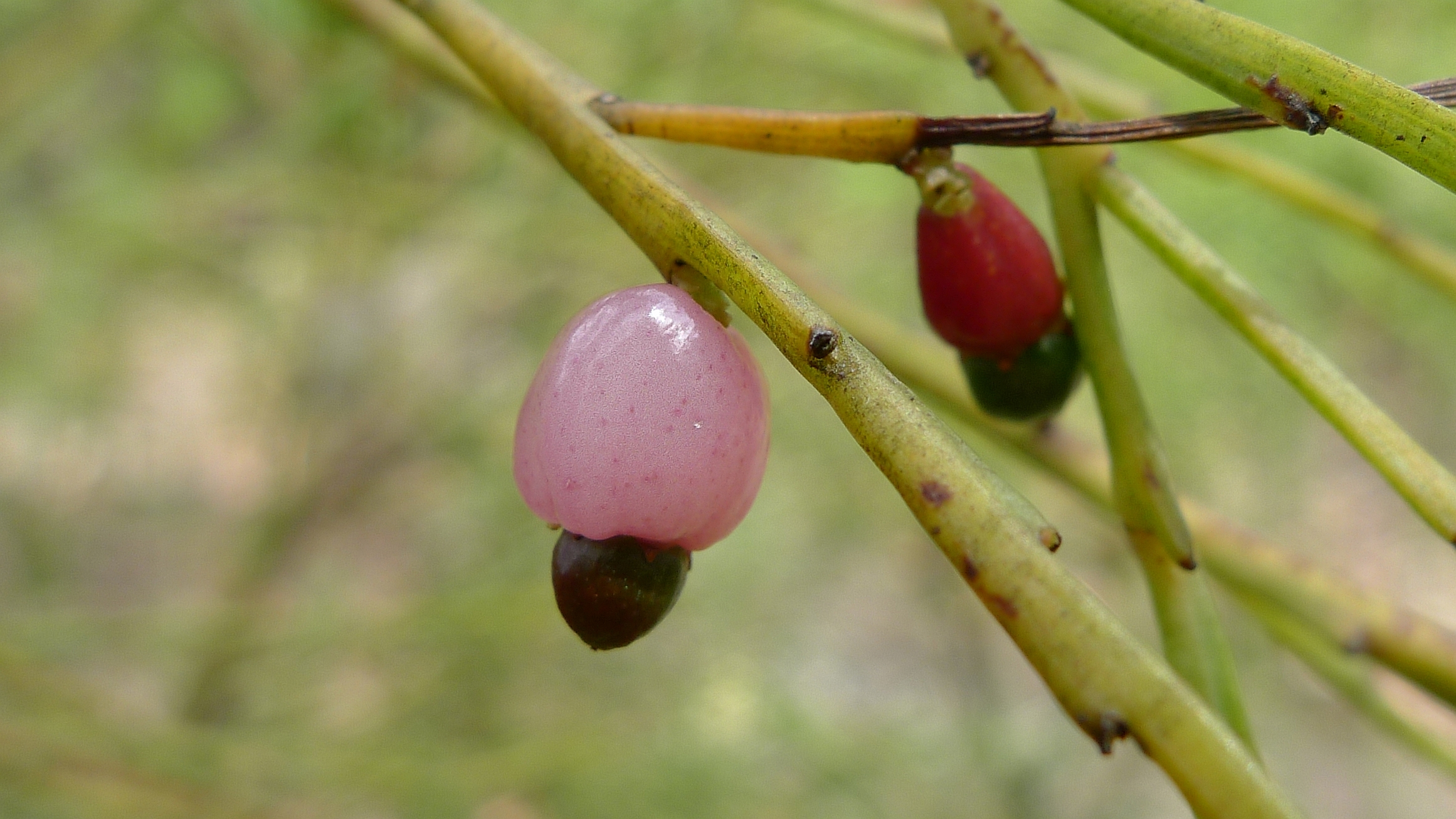
Exocarpos strictus, another species in the Exocarpos genus, demonstrating the seed outside of the fruit.

The genus Exocarpos is derived from the greek words exo and carpos. Exo means "outside", and carpos means "a fruit". Exocarpos is in reference to the way the seed is outside of the fruit.

== Habitat ==
Exocarpos menziesii can be found in Hawaii and is known historically on the island of Lanai. The range was once much larger, stretching from Kahuku Ranch to Hualalia and Pukapelle. Metrosideros shrubland or in dry forested areas. They are also sparsely distributed on lava flows between 1,400 and 2,100 m (4,600 and 6,900 ft) above sea level. Also, they are found in Montane Dry Systems on the Big Island of Hawaii.

== Threats ==
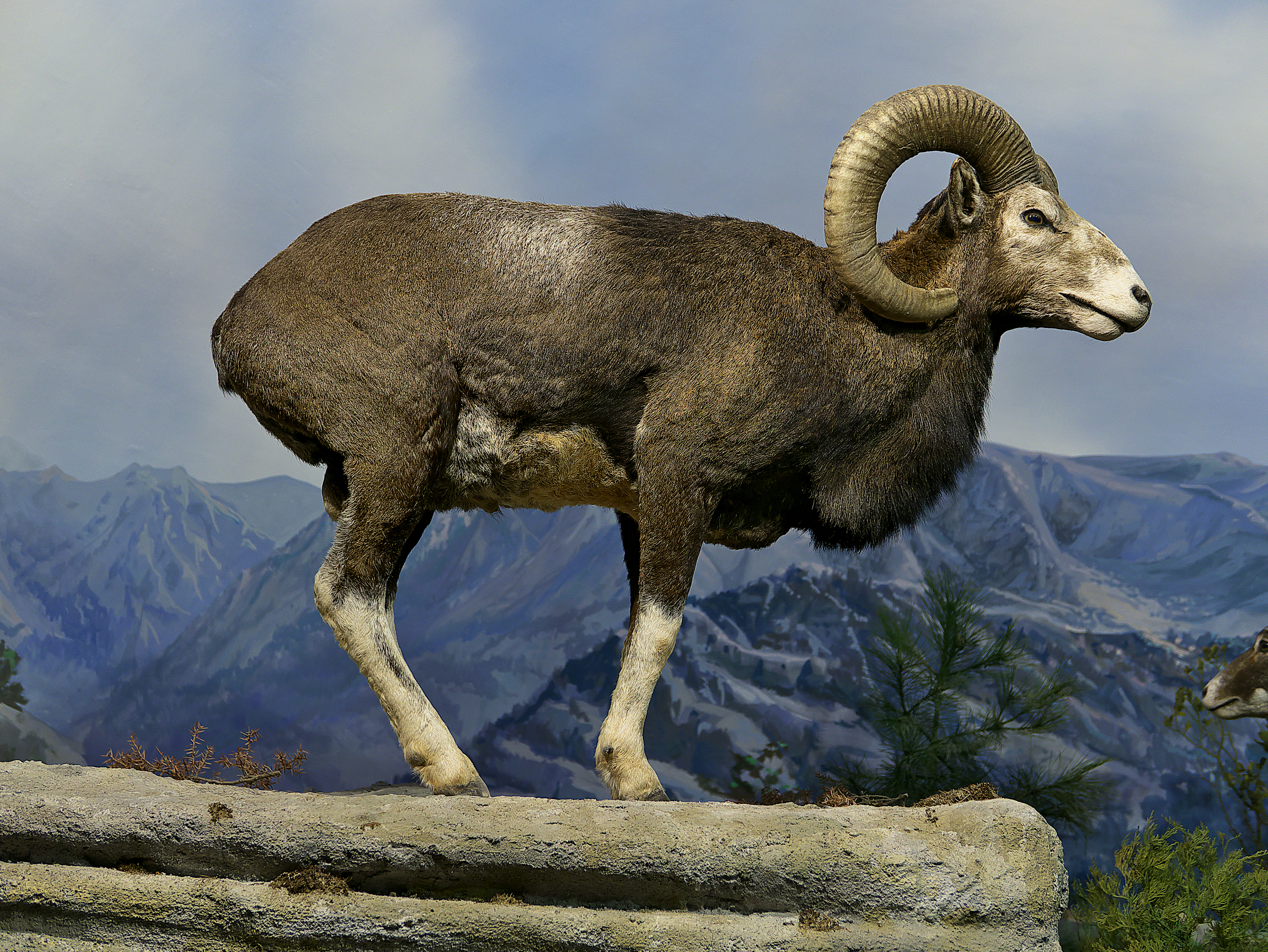
Mouflon, a species of wild sheep that eats Exocarpos menziesii.

Factors that contribute to the endangerment of this species are herbivory, habitat destruction, and habitat modification by wild goats, sheep, and mouflon. These ungulates are considered game animals and are managed by the state of Hawaii. However, hunting is not enough to manage their populations. Other factors include non-native species competition.

== Conservation ==
Exocarpos menziesii is listed as endangered and has global status G2 (imperilled). As of 2016, there are seven reported populations on Hawaii Island and six of those populations are very sparse. In February 2022, the U.S. Fish and Wildlife Service has drafted a recovery plan for 50 Hawaiian Archipelago wildlife and plant species that are endangered or threatened. E. menziesii is on this list of species. The goal of this plan is to help these species to become self-sustaining and secure in their ecosystems. They plan to combat predation, habitat degradation, herbivory, the spread of disease, and competition with invasive species.
