= Cherry Gardens =

Cherry Gardens may refer to:

- Cherry Gardens, Bristol, England
- Cherry Gardens, South Australia, Australia
- Cherry Gardens, Virginia, United States
