= Cherry Creek =

Cherry Creek may refer to:

Australia

- Cherry Creek, Queensland, a locality in the Toowoomba Region

Canada

- Cherry Creek (British Columbia), a creek
- Cherry Creek, British Columbia, a designated place

United States

- Cherry Creek (Arizona), a tributary of the Salt River
- Cherry Creek (Colorado), a tributary of the South Platte River
- Cherry Creek (South Dakota), a tributary of the Cheyenne River
- Cherry Creek (Tuolumne River), a stream in California
- Cherry Creek, Colorado, a census-designated place in Arapahoe County
- Cherry Creek, Columbus, Ohio, a neighborhood
- Cherry Creek, Denver, Colorado, a neighborhood
- Cherry Creek, Idaho, an unincorporated community in Oneida County
- Cherry Creek, Nevada, a historic community in White Pine County
- Cherry Creek, New York (town), in Chautauqua County
- Cherry Creek, New York (village), within the Town of Cherry Creek
- Cherry Creek, South Dakota, an unincorporated community in Ziebach County
- Cherry Creek Golf Links, a golf club in Riverhead, New York
- Cherry Creek High School, Greenwood Village, Colorado
- Cherry Creek Range, a line of mountains in Nevada
- Cherry Creek Rockshelter, an archaeological site in Colorado
- Cherry Creek School District, a school district in Arapahoe County, Colorado
- Cherry Creek State Park, Colorado
- Cherry Creek Township, Buffalo County, Nebraska

== See also ==
- Cherry Creek Campaign, 1890 conflict between Apaches and the United States Army
- Cherry Valley Creek, a tributary of the Susquehanna River in New York, United States
- Cherry Creek Ruins, part of the Sierra Ancha Cliff Dwellings, a series of Pre-Columbian Native American cliff-dwellings in Arizona
