= Exocarpos homalocladus =

Scientific classification
- Kingdom: Plantae
- Clade: Tracheophytes
- Clade: Angiosperms
- Clade: Eudicots
- Order: Santalales
- Family: Santalaceae
- Genus: Exocarpos
- Species: E. homalocladus

Binomial name
- Exocarpos homalocladus C.Moore & F.Muell. (1872)

Synonyms
- Exocarpos homaloclada C.Moore & F.Muell. (1872); Xylophyllos homalocladus (C.Moore & F.Muell.) Kuntze (1891)

Species of flowering plant

Exocarpos homalocladus, commonly known as the grass tree, is a flowering plant in the sandalwood family. The specific epithet comes from the Greek homalos (“flat”) and clados (“cladode”, a leaf-like stem, specialised for photosynthesis), with reference to the structure of the plant.

== Description ==
It is a shrub or small tree growing to 4 m in height. The flat cladodes are 50–100 mm long, 1–2 mm wide. True leaves only occur on juvenile shoots; they are narrowly lanceolate, 50–80 mm long, 5–15 mm wide. The tiny yellow-green flowers occur in clusters from March to July. The fruits are red and fleshy, 8 mm long and seated on swollen red stalks that turn translucent pink when ripe.

== Distribution and habitat ==
The species is endemic to Australia’s subtropical Lord Howe Island in the Tasman Sea, where it is fairly common and found from sea level to the summits of the mountains.
