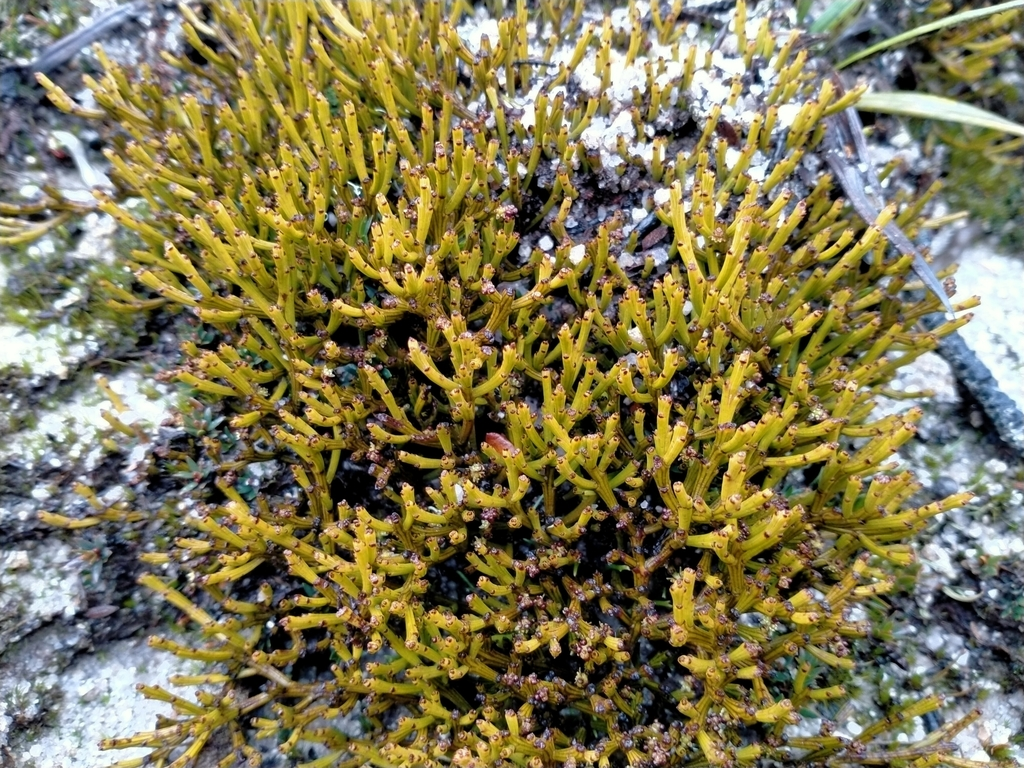

Scientific classification
- Kingdom: Plantae
- Clade: Tracheophytes
- Clade: Angiosperms
- Clade: Eudicots
- Order: Santalales
- Family: Santalaceae
- Genus: Exocarpos
- Species: E. bidwillii

Binomial name
- Exocarpos bidwillii Hook.f.

= Exocarpos bidwillii =

Shrub endemic to New Zealand

Exocarpos bidwillii is a small, sprawling, leafless shrub endemic to New Zealand and is a member of the family Santalaceae, most of which are regarded as root hemiparasites. In this instance there is a body of opinion that Exocarpos bidwillii may not be parasitic.

== Distribution and habitat ==
It is found mainly in montane to subalpine open areas, mostly in rocky places of the South Island, from latitudes 41° to 45° 30' (corrected from H.H. Allan's mid-ocean figure of 48° 30').

Host plants include snow tōtara, tāwhai rauriki, and mānuka.

== Etymology and taxonomy ==
The species name is after John Carne Bidwill.

Exocarpos bidwillii is in the Santalaceae family. The name of the species was given by Joseph Hooker.

== Phenology ==
According to Allan 1961 Exocarpos bidwillii flowering occurs January to February, and fruiting January to April. iNaturalist observations indicate that the peak month for flowering is September and for fruiting is December and January. Recent extensive field observations in three sites in the Nelson Mineral Belt with macro photography have provided clear identification of reproductive anatomy at each phenological stage.

== Gallery ==
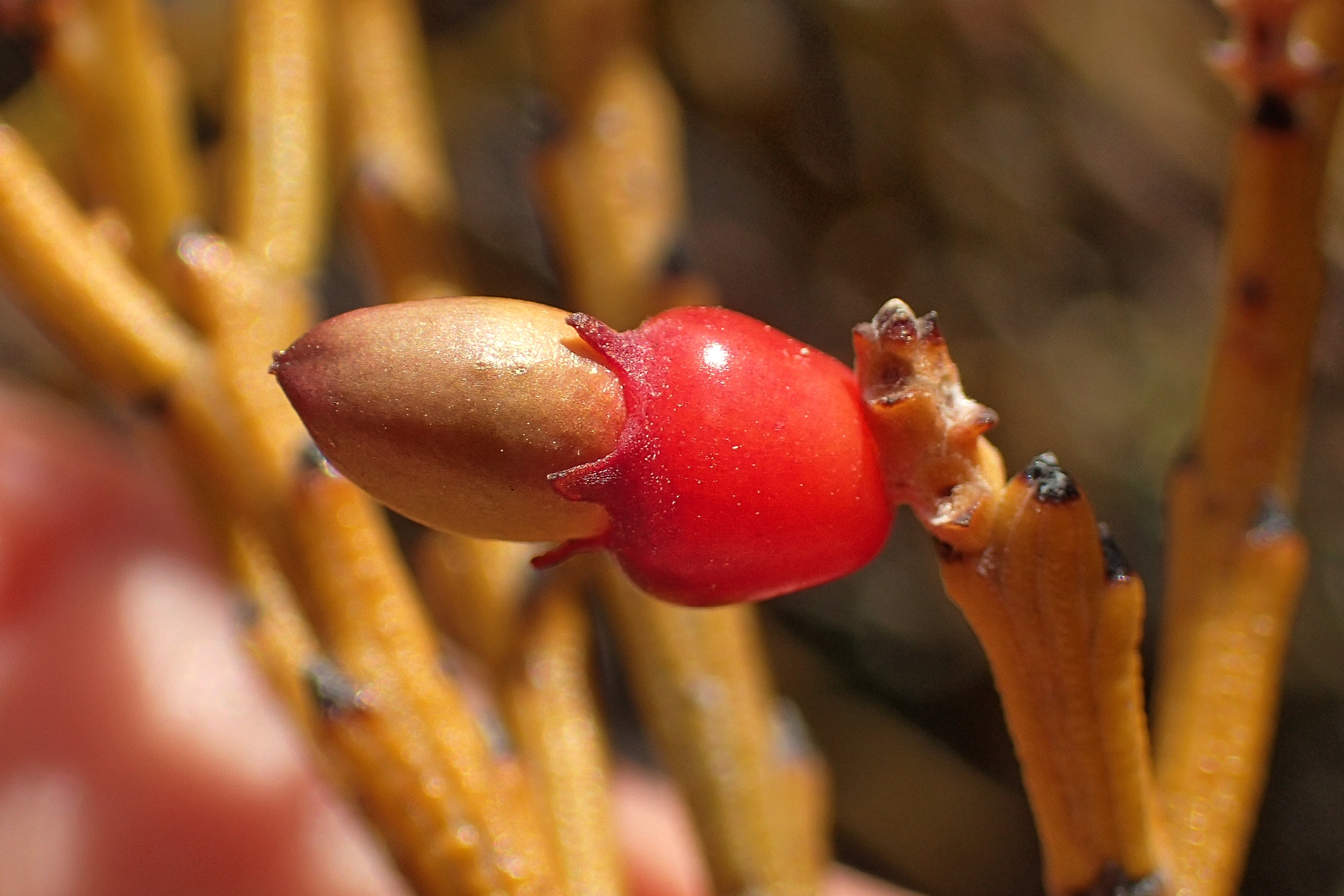
Fruit of E. bidwillii

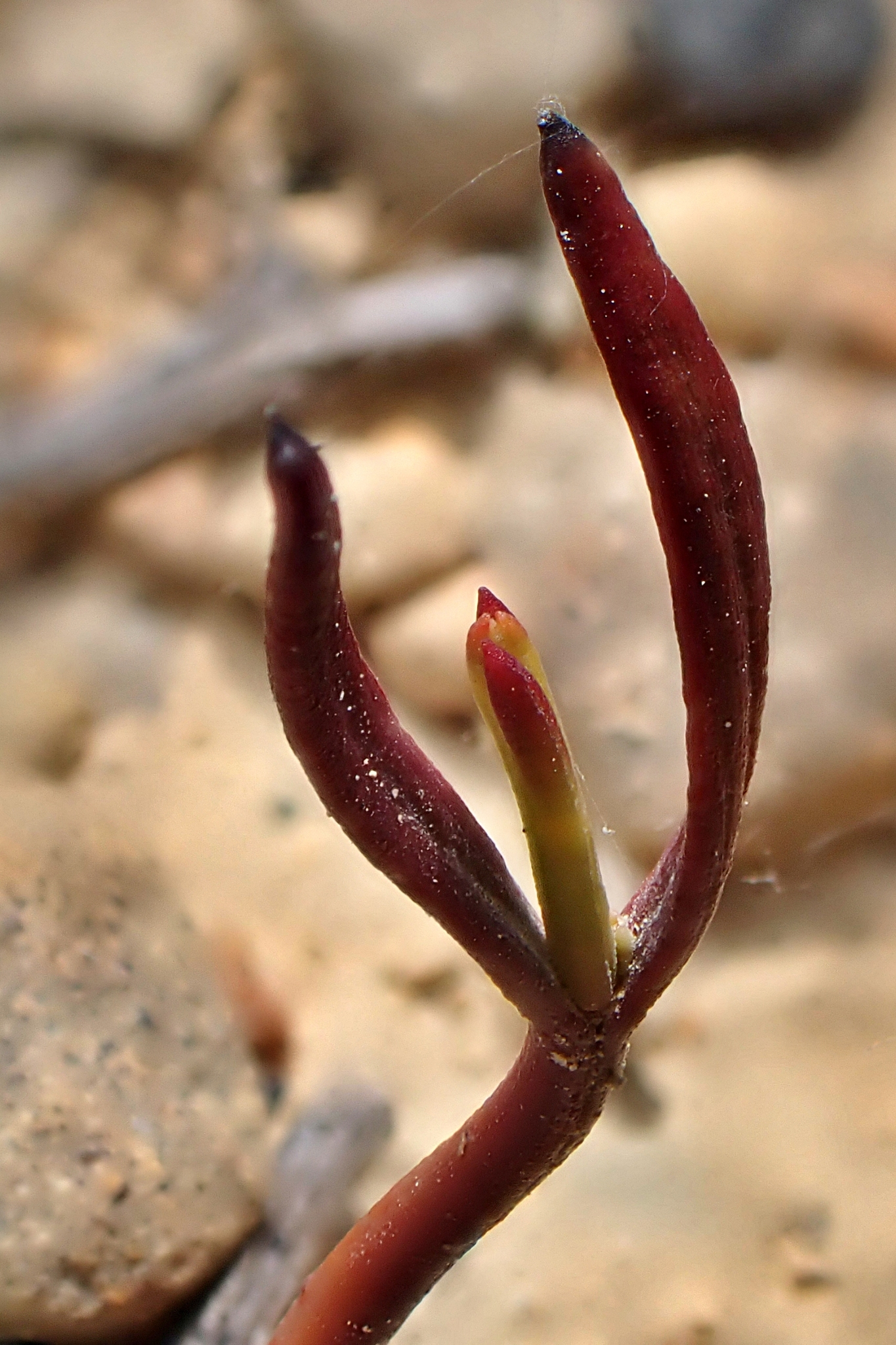
Early stage seedling with cotyledons and emerging stem.

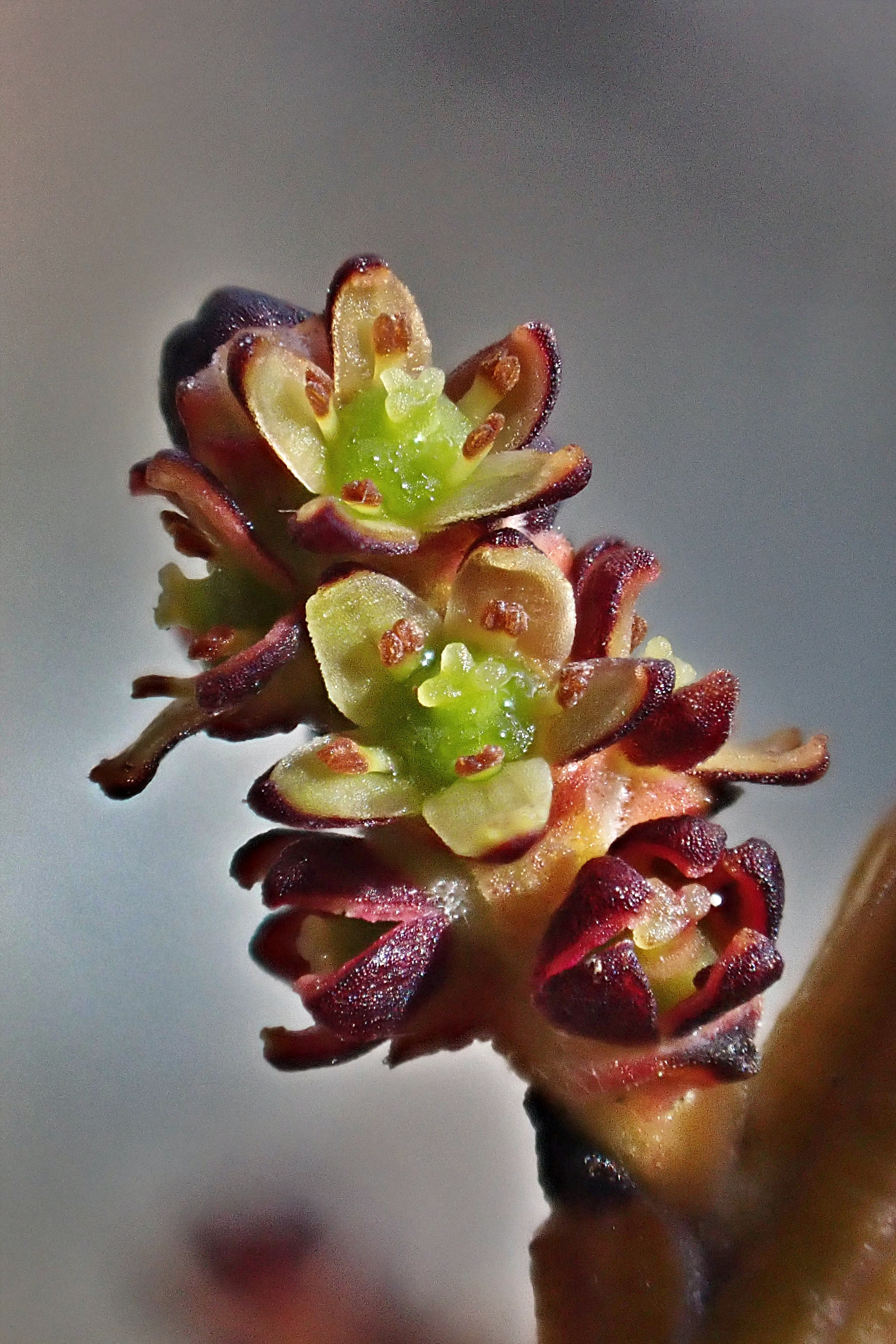
Female flowers, ca. 2.00mm across. Peak flowering mid August to mid October.

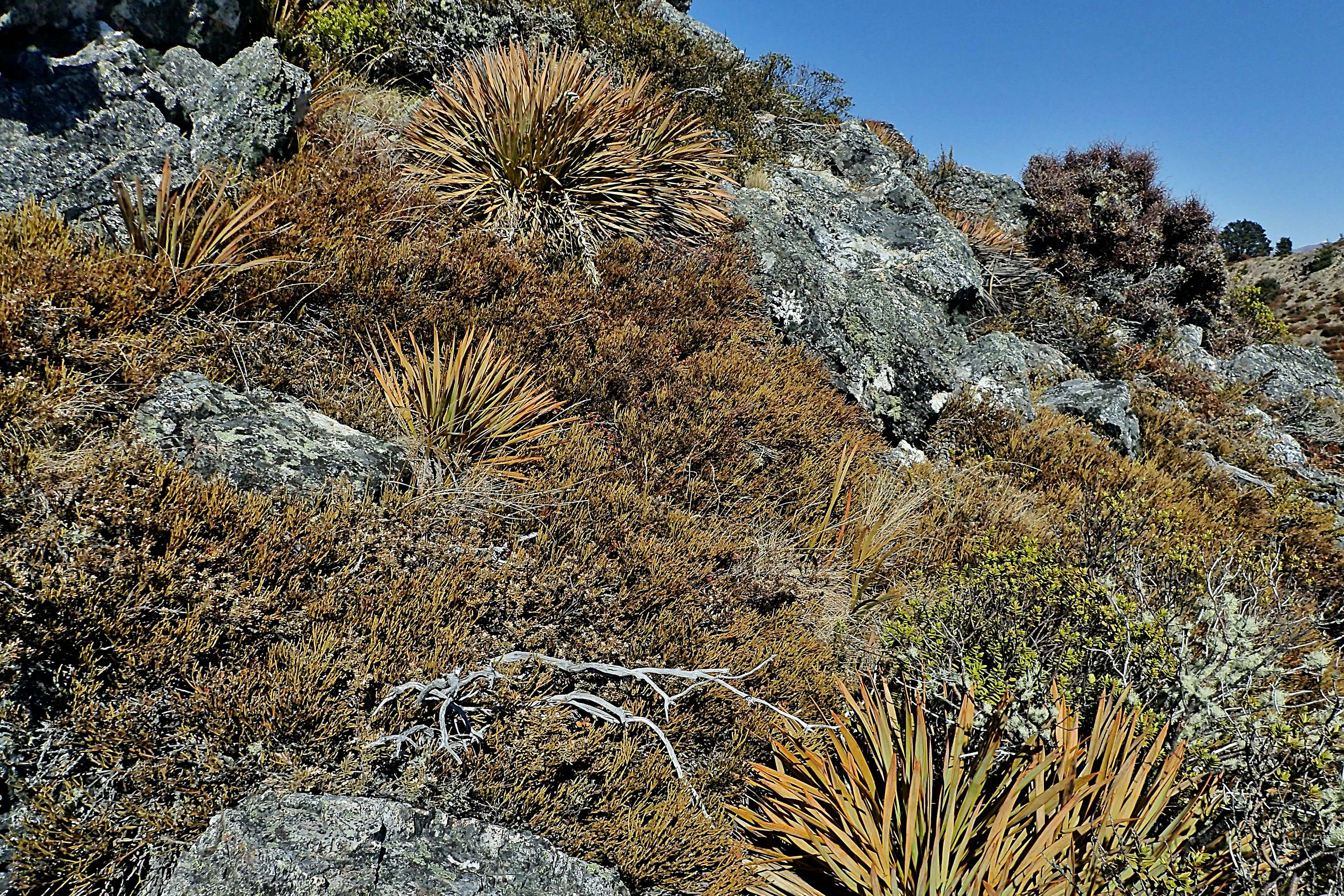
Typical habitat on Mt. Isobel, Hanmer Springs

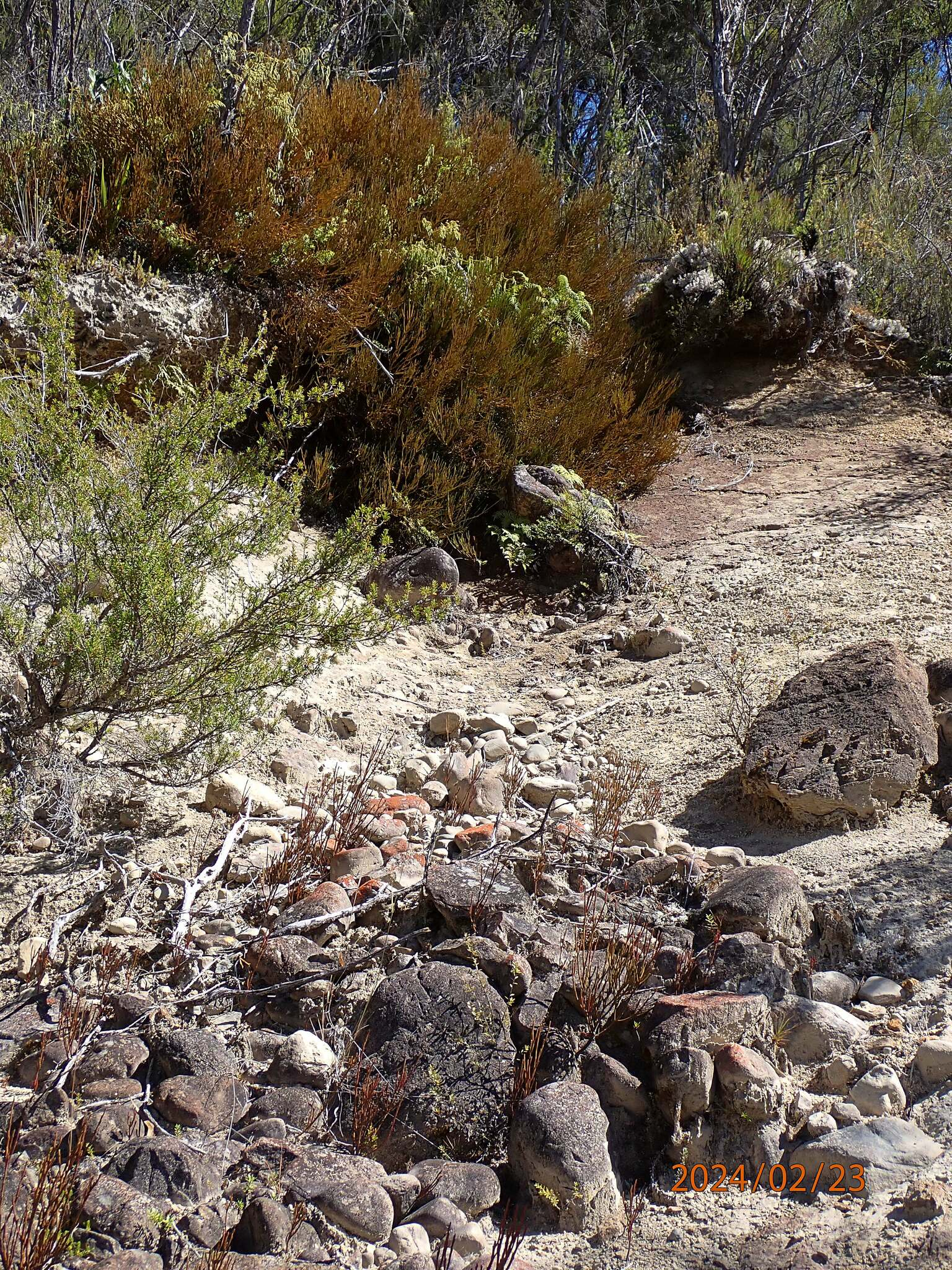
Exocarpos bidwillii with seedlings. Wairau Valley, NZ.

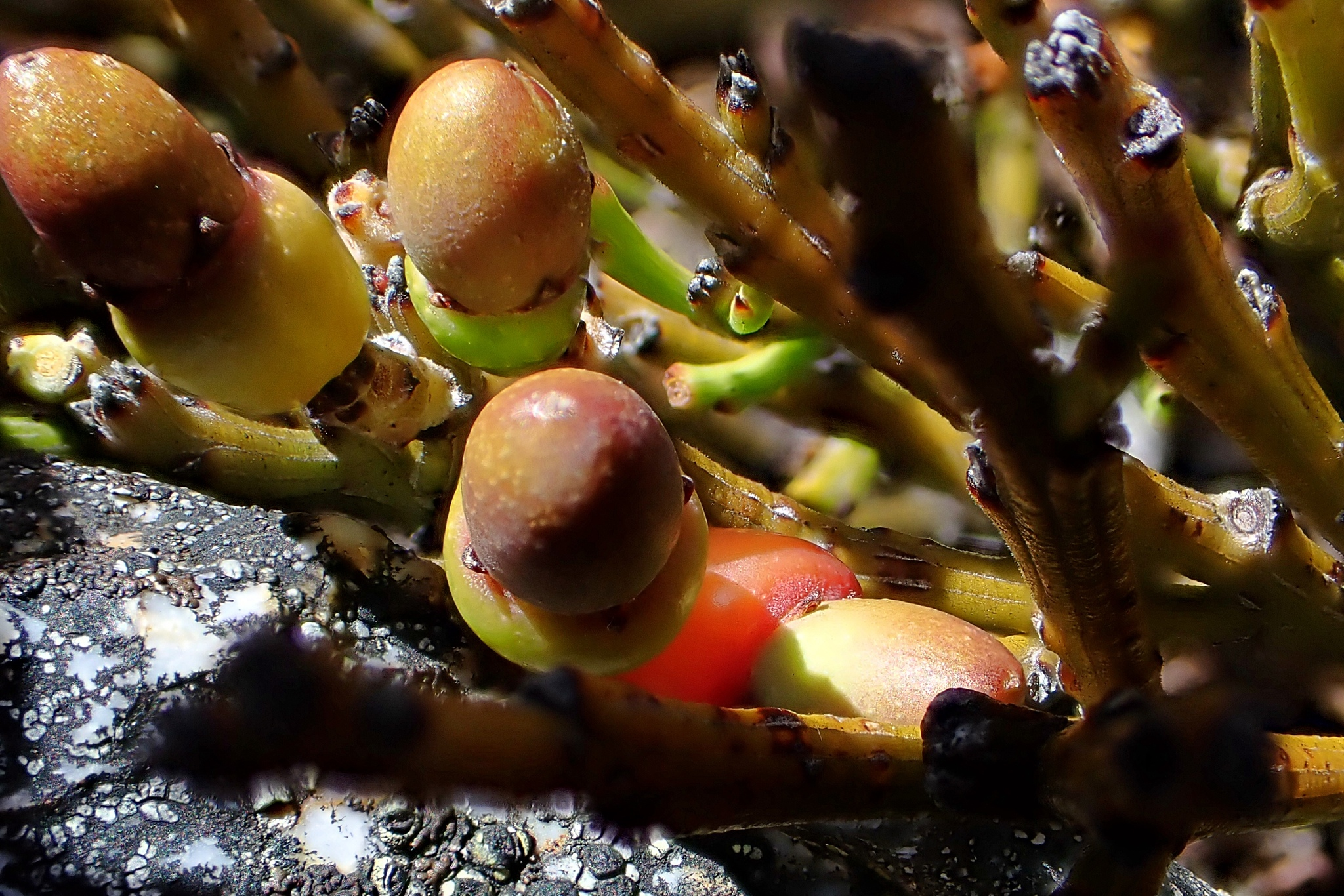
Exocarpos bidwillii with immature fruit. Cobb Ridge, NZ.
