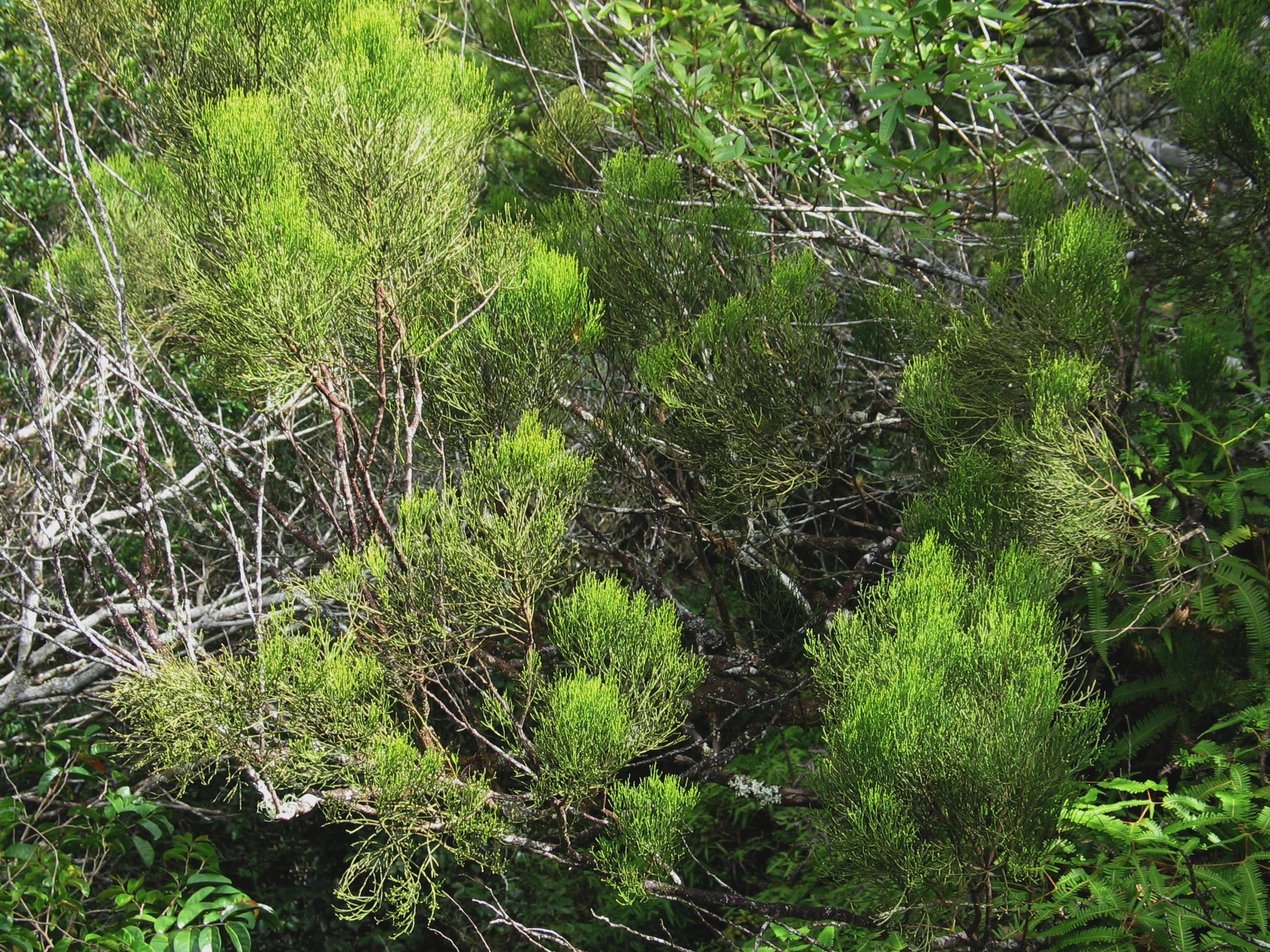

Conservation status
- Endangered (IUCN 2.3)

Scientific classification
- Kingdom: Plantae
- Clade: Tracheophytes
- Clade: Angiosperms
- Clade: Eudicots
- Order: Santalales
- Family: Santalaceae
- Genus: Exocarpos
- Species: E. gaudichaudii

Binomial name
- Exocarpos gaudichaudii A.DC.

= Exocarpos gaudichaudii =

Species of flowering plant

Exocarpos gaudichaudii (also called Gaudichaud's exocarpus or hulumoa) is a species of plant in the Santalaceae family. It is endemic to Hawaii. It is threatened by habitat loss.
