= Exocarpos acerbus =

Scientific classification
- Kingdom: Plantae
- Clade: Tracheophytes
- Clade: Angiosperms
- Clade: Eudicots
- Order: Santalales
- Family: Santalaceae
- Genus: Exocarpos
- Species: E. acerbus

Binomial name
- Exocarpos acerbus (R.Br.) Lepschi

Synonyms
- Leptomeria acerba R.Br. (1810) (basionym); Omphacomeria acerba (R.Br.) A.DC.; Omphacomeria acerba var. typica omin

Genus of plants

Exocarpos acerbus is a species of flowering plant belonging to the family Santalaceae. It is a dioecious shrub native to central-eastern and southeastern New South Wales and eastern Victoria in southeastern Australia.
