= Cherry Street =

Cherry Street may refer to:

- Cherry Street (Toronto), Canada
- Cherry Street (Manhattan), New York, U.S.
- Cherry Street, Toledo, Ohio, U.S.
- Cherry Street, Tulsa, Oklahoma, U.S.
- Cherry Street (Philadelphia), U.S.
- Cherry Street (Macon), U.S., the location of The Telegraph
- Cherry Street, Hong Kong

== See also ==
- Cherry Street Bridge (disambiguation)
- Cherry Street Historic District (disambiguation)
- Cherry Street Hotel, Toronto
- Cherry Street Tavern, Philadelphia
