= Exocarpos baumannii =

Scientific classification
- Kingdom: Plantae
- Clade: Tracheophytes
- Clade: Angiosperms
- Clade: Eudicots
- Order: Santalales
- Family: Santalaceae
- Genus: Exocarpos
- Species: E. baumannii

Binomial name
- Exocarpos baumannii Stauffer

Synonyms
- Elaphanthera baumannii (Stauffer) N.Hallé

Species of flowering plant in the mistletoe family

Exocarpos baumannii is a species of hemiparasitic shrub in the Santalaceae family. It is endemic to New Caledonia.
