= Cherry Island =

Cherry Island may refer to

- Cherry Island (Antarctica)
- Cherry Island (Loch Ness), Scotland
- Cherry Island (Maryland), an island in Dorchester County, Maryland
- Cherry Island (Michigan), in the Detroit River
- Cherry Island (New Brunswick), a small island in West Isles Parish, New Brunswick, Canada
- Anuta, an island in Temotu Province, Solomon Islands
