= Exocarpos longifolius =

Scientific classification
- Kingdom: Plantae
- Clade: Tracheophytes
- Clade: Angiosperms
- Clade: Eudicots
- Order: Santalales
- Family: Santalaceae
- Genus: Exocarpos
- Species: E. longifolius

Binomial name
- Exocarpos longifolius (L.) Endl., 1836

Synonyms
- Phyllanthus ceramica Pers., 1807; Xylophylla ceramica (Pers.) Rumph. ex R.Br., 1814; Xylophylla longifolia L., 1771; Exocarpos ceramicus (Pers.) Spreng., 1818; Exocarpos aberrans (Gagnep.) Gagnep., 1947; Exocarpos rolfeanus (Kuntze) Merr., 1909; Sarcopus aberrans Gagnep., 1947; Xylophyllos rolfeanus Kuntze, 1891

Species of plant

Exocarpos longifolius is a plant in the family Santalaceae that occurs from Vietnam to the Lesser Sunda Islands and New Guinea. It is an epiphytic parasite rainforest plant with unusual flowers, which for a period of time caused it to be classified as a new gymnosperm family in the order Gnetales.
