= Exocarpos luteolus =

Conservation status
- Critically Imperiled (NatureServe)

Scientific classification
- Kingdom: Plantae
- Clade: Embryophytes
- Clade: Tracheophytes
- Clade: Angiosperms
- Clade: Eudicots
- Order: Santalales
- Family: Santalaceae
- Genus: Exocarpos
- Species: E. luteolus

Binomial name
- Exocarpos luteolus Forbes

Species of flowering plant

Exocarpos luteolus is a rare species of flowering plant in the sandalwood family known by the common names leafy ballart or heau. It is endemic to Hawaii, where it is known only from the island of Kauai. There are eight populations remaining, for a total global population of only 39 individuals. The plant was federally listed as an endangered species of the United States in 1994.

This plant is a shrub growing one half to two meters tall. There are two types of leaves, lance-shaped to oval leaf blades up to 8 centimeters long and smaller, reduced leaves that are like scales. Some plants have only scale-like leaves and appear leafless at first glance. The flower has six greenish petals each about a millimeter long. The fruit is a yellow drupe between 1 and 2 centimeters long.

This rare plant grows in several types of habitat, including bogs, open ridges, and closed wet forests. Plants sharing the forested habitat types may include ohia (Metrosideros polymorpha), uluhe (Dicranopteris linearis), koa (Acacia koa), kauila (Alphitonia ponderosa), and poʻola nui (Bidens cosmoides). Plants in its bog habitat may include pa iniu (Astelia waialealae), and kanawao (Broussaisia arguta).

This plant is nearing extinction because of a number of threats, mainly habitat destruction and degradation from feral goats and pigs. Rats consume the seeds. Many invasive plant species are present in the habitat, including prickly blackberry (Rubus argutus), banana poka (Passiflora tarminiana), Santa Barbara daisy (Erigeron karvinskianus) paii iha (Christella dentata), lantana (Lantana camara), and molasses grass (Melinis minutiflora).
