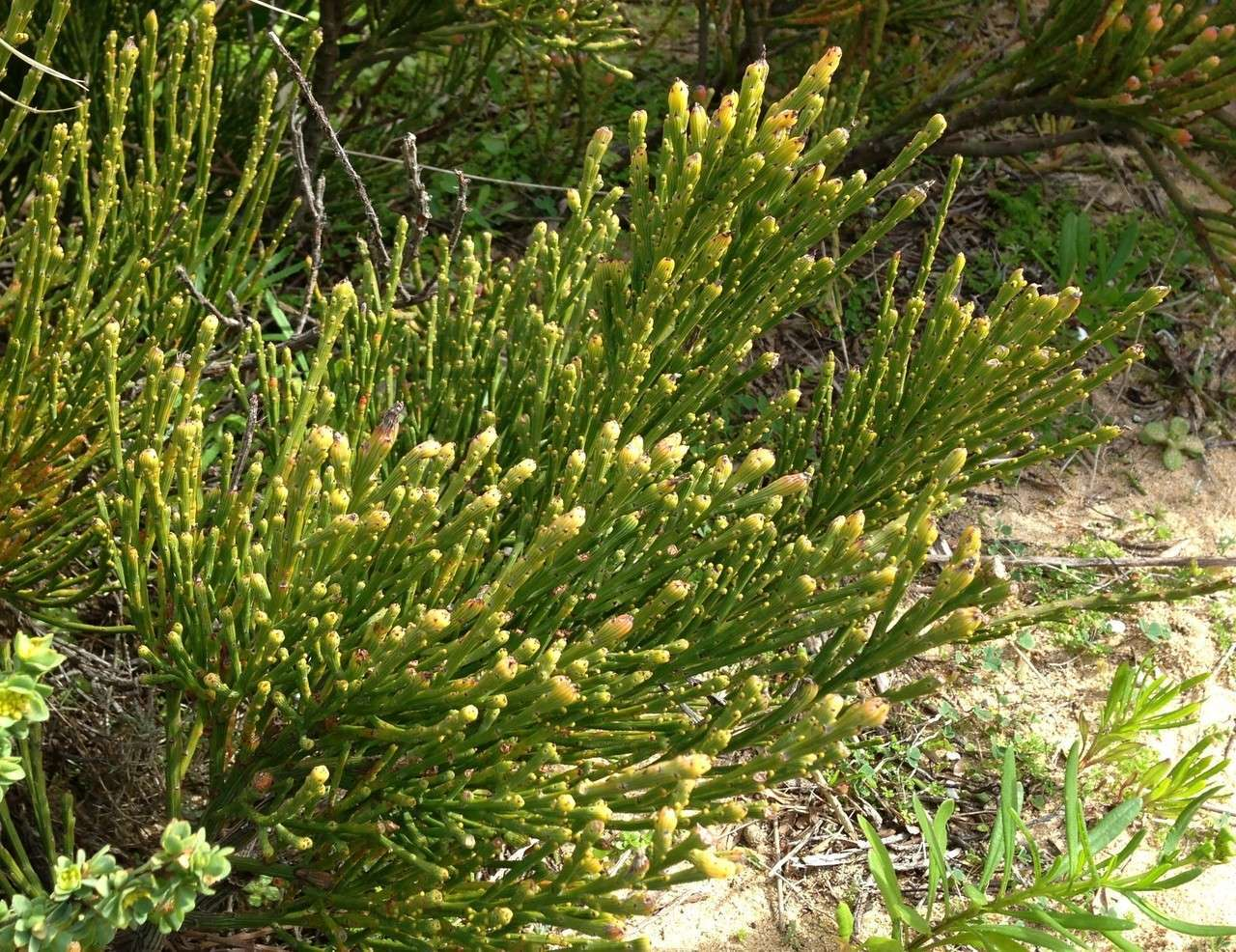
- Specimen growing in Warrnambool, Victoria, Australia

Scientific classification
- Kingdom: Plantae
- Clade: Tracheophytes
- Clade: Angiosperms
- Clade: Eudicots
- Order: Santalales
- Family: Santalaceae
- Genus: Exocarpos
- Species: E. syrticola

Binomial name
- Exocarpos syrticola (F.Muell. ex Miq.) Stauffer
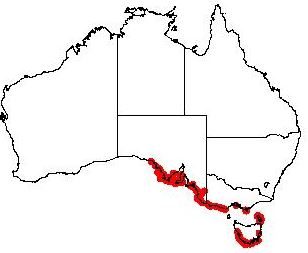
- Occurrence data from AVH

= Exocarpos syrticola =

Species of plant

Exocarpos syrticola (common name coastal ballart, coast ballart) belongs to the sandalwood plant family (Santalaceae). It is a species endemic to Australia and found on the coastal fringes of Victoria, Tasmania, and South Australia.

It was first described in 1856 by Ferdinand von Mueller as Exocarpos strictus var. syrticola, and given species status in 1959 by Hans Ulrich Stauffer.
