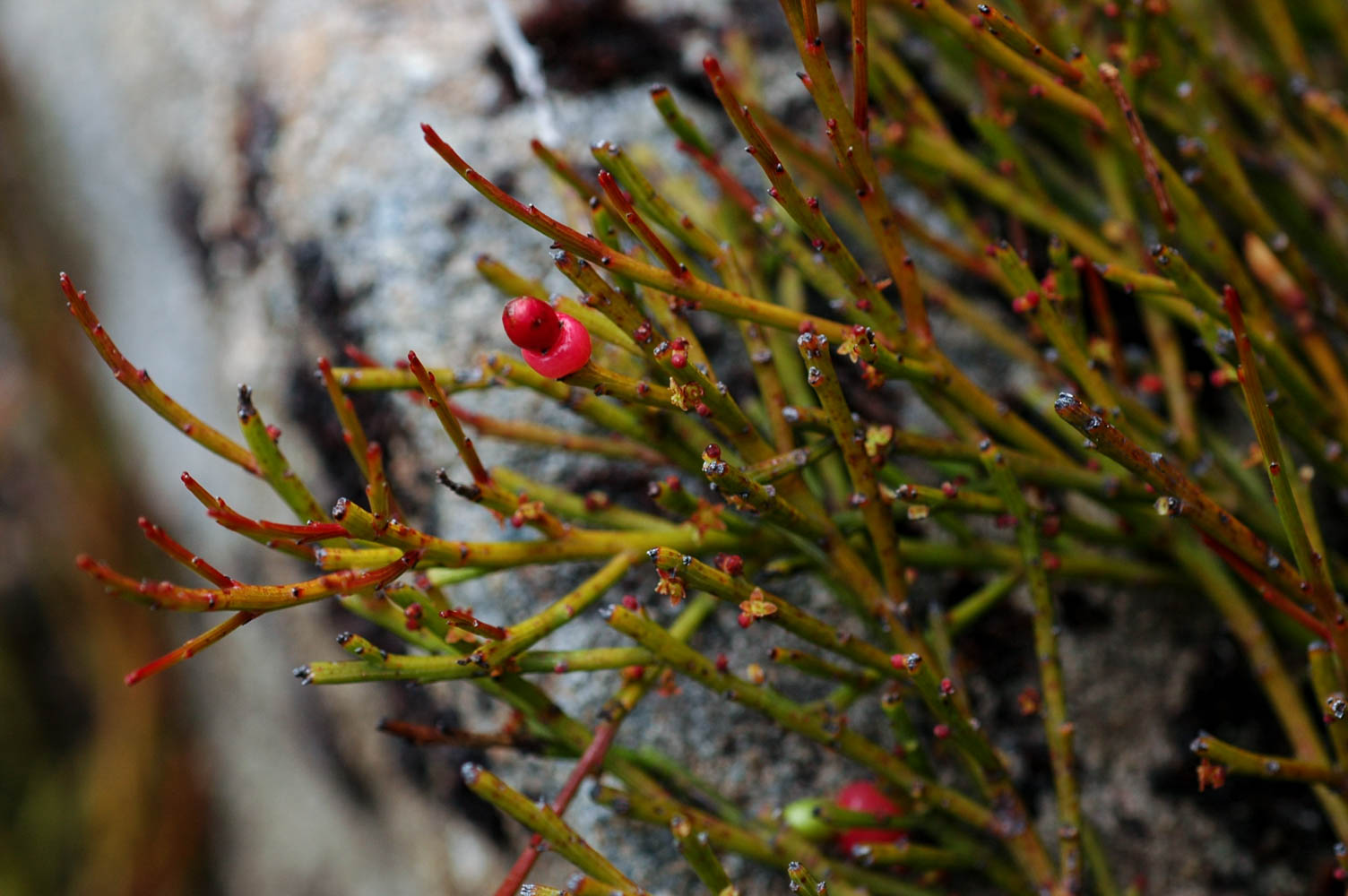

Scientific classification
- Kingdom: Plantae
- Clade: Tracheophytes
- Clade: Angiosperms
- Clade: Eudicots
- Order: Santalales
- Family: Santalaceae
- Genus: Exocarpos
- Species: E. humifusus

Binomial name
- Exocarpos humifusus R.Br.

= Exocarpos humifusus =

Species of flowering plant

Exocarpos humifusus, also known as mountain native-cherry, is a small shrub member of the family Santalaceae, all of which are hemiparasites. Exocarpos humifusus is a dwarfish and sprawling shrub with woody stems, and small dry fruits that grow atop a fleshy red stalk, hence the common name of native-cherry.

== Description ==
Exocarpos humifusus is a rigid, woody dwarf shrub with branches prostrate and spreading over the ground and rocks. The stems are dark yellow-green tinged with red, and are ribbed with rounded edges. The leaves are triangular and scale shaped, about 0.5 mm (0.020 in) long, arranged alternately along the stem. The flowers are generally 4 parted, approximately 2.5 mm (0.098 in) in diameter and grow in bunches of 2–3 on a short stalk at the end of a stem. The fruit is a small greenish-black drupe or nut 3–4 mm (0.12–0.16 in) in length, that grows atop a fleshy receptacle. When mature the receptacle of the fruit is dark red fleshy, juicy and edible, attracting animals as distributors.

== Habitat and distribution ==
Exocarpos humifusus is endemic to Tasmania. It grows abundantly above 1,000 m (3,300 ft) and on lower elevation mountains in the south-west, in sub-alpine and alpine areas. It is found growing over the surfaces of rocks on mountain plateaus and summits throughout Tasmania. It is widespread among the plant communities of alpine heath and fjaeldmark.

== Gallery ==
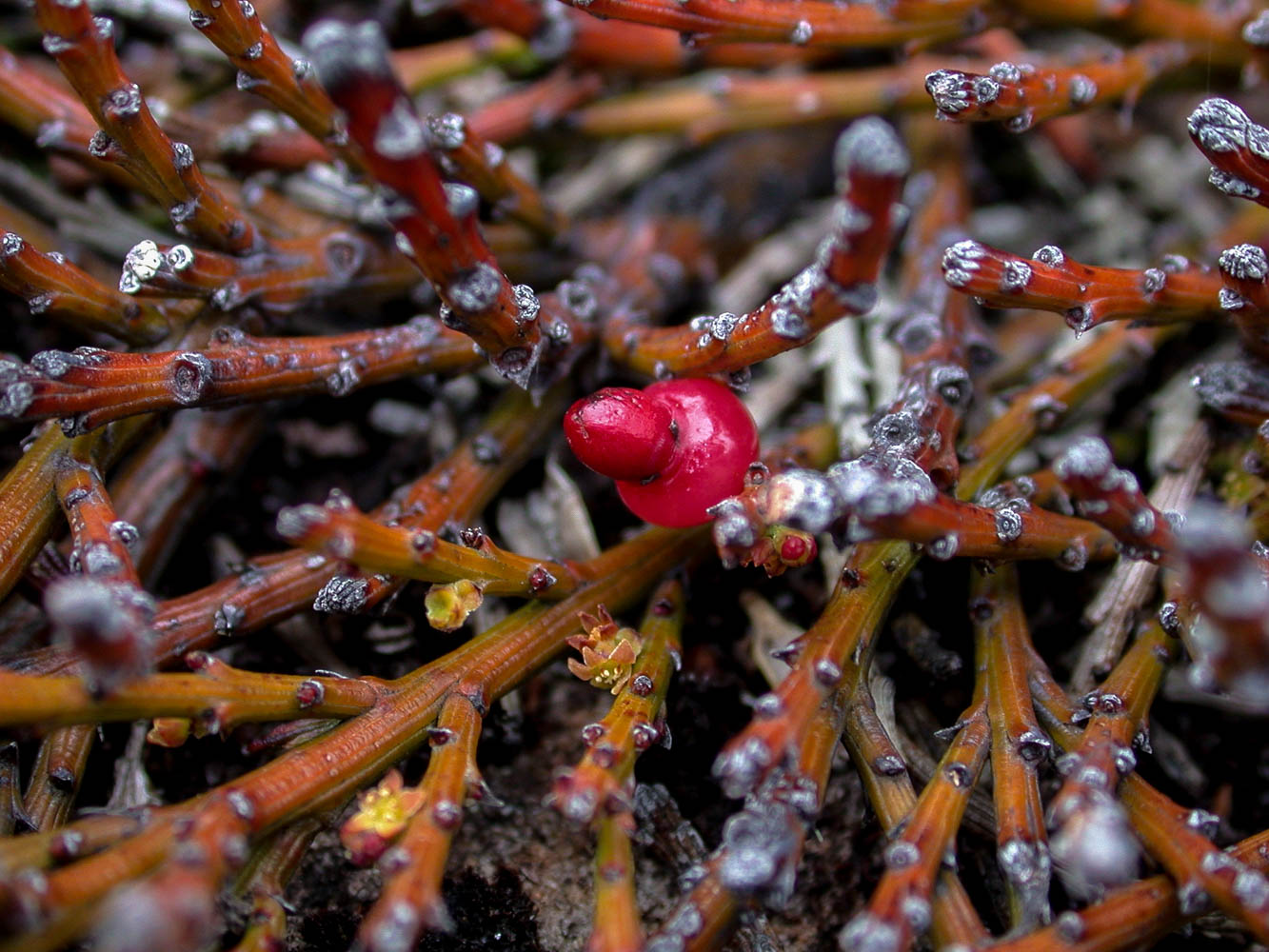
Stems and fruit of E. humifusus

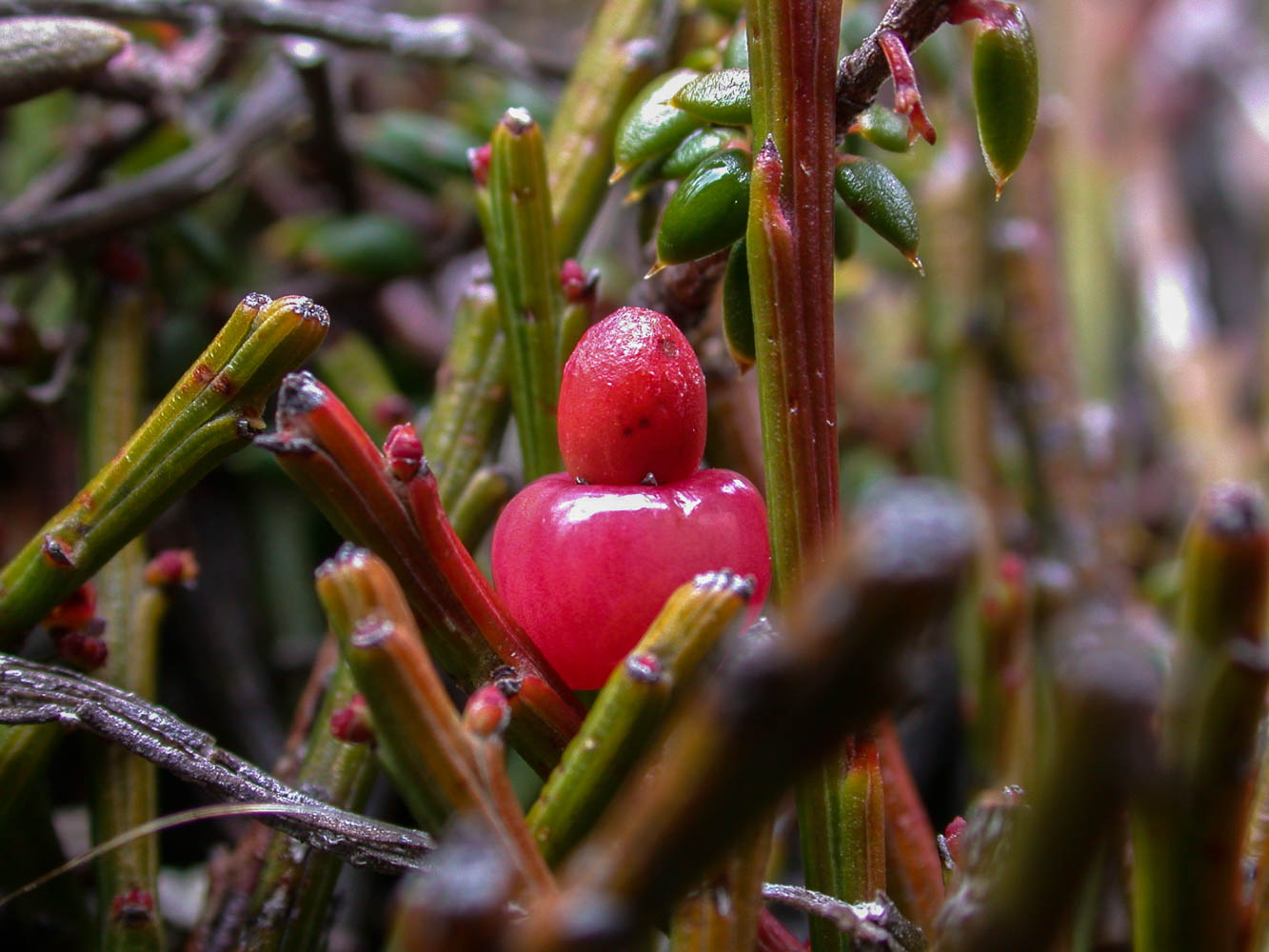
Enlarged receptacle with fruit

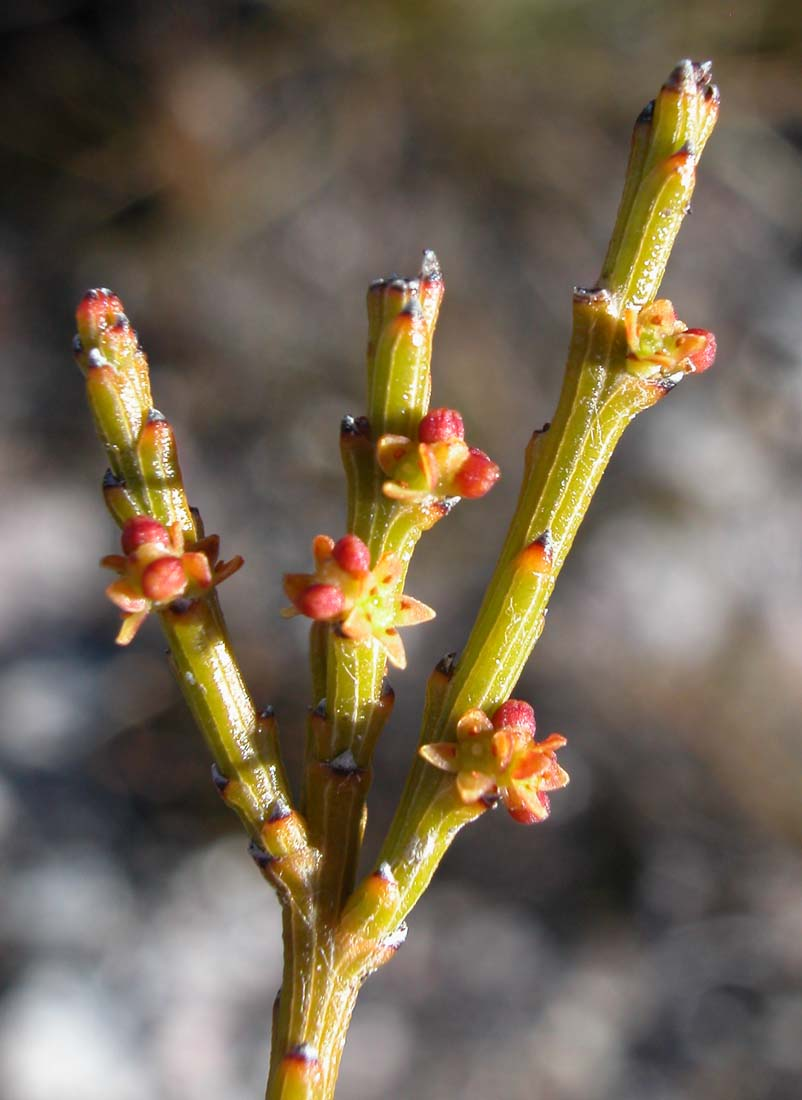
Stems, leaves, and flowers
