= Cherry Street Bridge =

Cherry Street Bridge may refer to:

- Cherry Street Strauss Trunnion Bascule Bridge, a bascule bridge and Warren truss in Toronto, Ontario, Canada
- Cherry Street lift bridge, a bascule lift bridge on Cherry Street, in Toronto, Ontario, Canada
- Cherry Street Bridge (Shell Rock, Iowa), U.S., listed on the National Register of Historic Places
- Martin Luther King Bridge (Toledo, Ohio), U.S., over the Maumee River
- Cherry Street Bridge (Mississippi), U.S., a Mississippi Landmark
