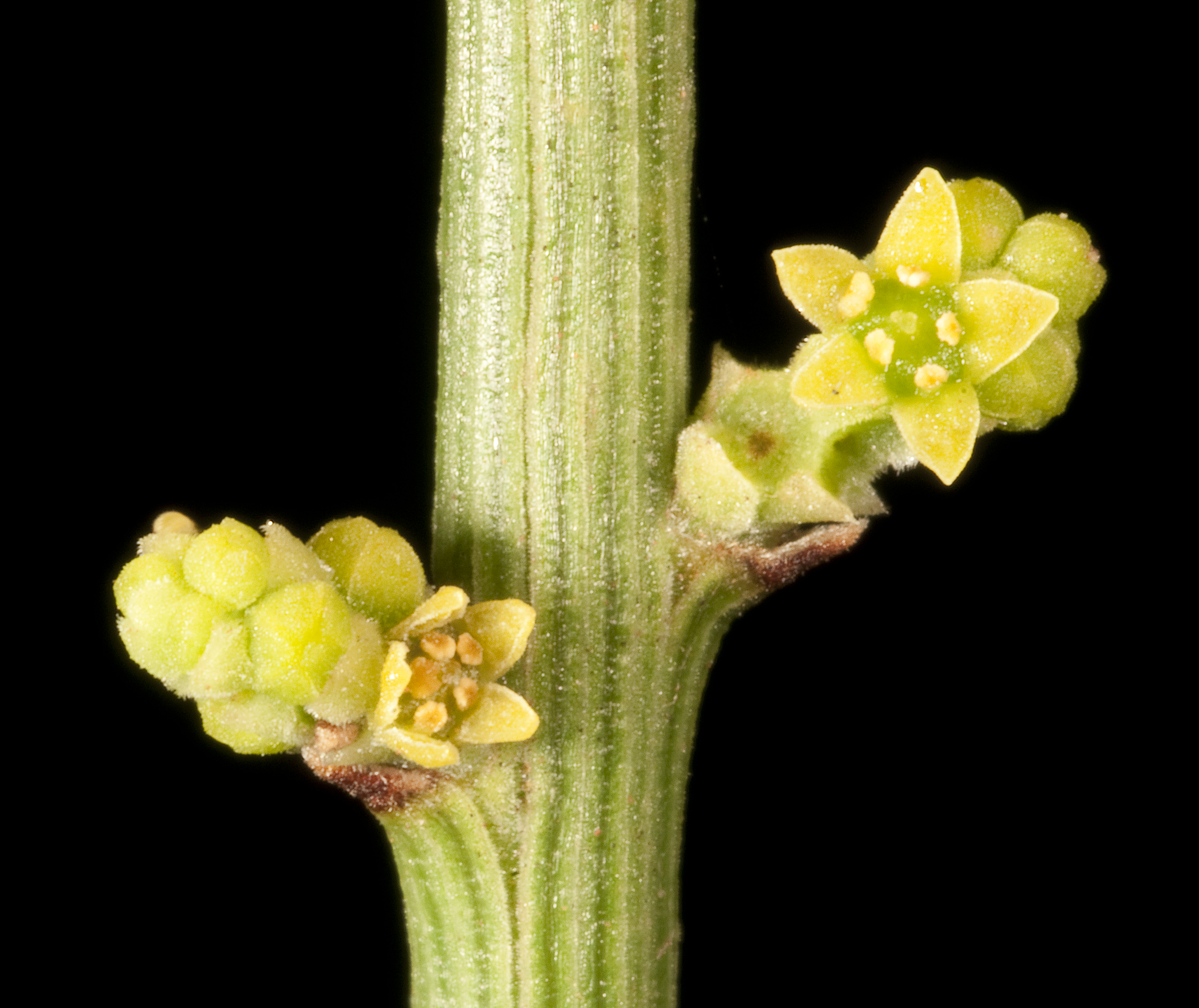

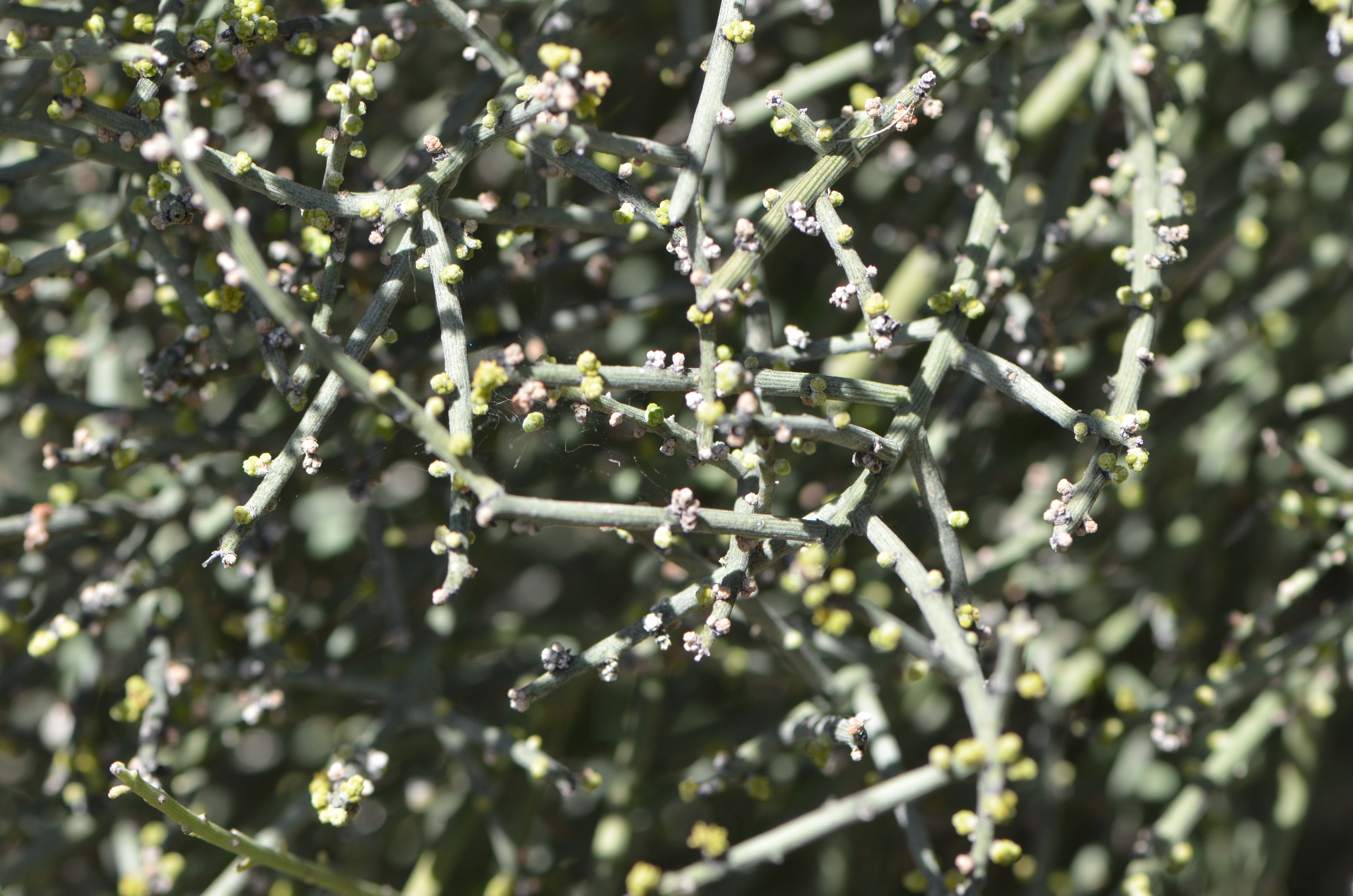

Scientific classification
- Kingdom: Plantae
- Clade: Tracheophytes
- Clade: Angiosperms
- Clade: Eudicots
- Order: Santalales
- Family: Santalaceae
- Genus: Exocarpos
- Species: E. aphyllus

Binomial name
- Exocarpos aphyllus Robert Brown
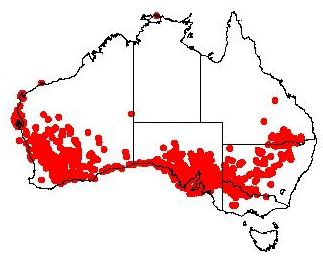
- Occurrence data from AVH

Synonyms
- Exocarpos aphylla R.Br. orth. var.; Exocarpos leptomerioides F.Muell. ex Miq.; Exocarpus aphylla F.Muell. orth. var.; Exocarpus leptomerioides Miq. orth. var.; Xylophyllos aphyllus (R.Br.) Kuntze

= Exocarpos aphyllus =

Leafless ballart

Species of plant

Exocarpos aphyllus commonly known as leafless ballart,or chuk, chukk, dtulya and merrinby Noongar people, is a flowering plant in the family Santalaceae. It is a much-branched perennial with small, yellow-green flowers and is endemic to Australia.

== Description ==
Exocarpos aphyllus is a perennial small tree or shrub to 5 m (16 ft) high, much-branched, grey-greenish, terete, rigid branchlets and scale-like hairy, ovate, alternate leaves, initially covered in star-shaped hairs, becoming smooth with age and about 1 mm (0.039 in) long. Flowers are very small, borne in dense clusters or spikes of 2-10 in upper leaf axils, 2–5 mm (0.079–0.197 in) long, sessile and yellowish green. Flowering occurs mostly from June to September and fruit is an ovoid drupe, 3–5 mm (0.12–0.20 in) long, more or less ribbed, bright red and with age turning almost black.

== Taxonomy and naming ==
Exocarpos aphyllus was first formally described in 1810 by Robert Brown and the description was published in his Prodromus Florae Novae Hollandiae.The specific epithet (aphyllus) means 'without leaves'.

== Distribution and habitat ==
Leafless ballart grows in a variety of habitats including woodland, rocky and clay loam in New South Wales, Queensland, Victoria, Western Australia and South Australia.

== Uses ==
Noongar (south-west Western Australian Indigenous Australians) boiled the stems in water to make decoctions for internal use to treat colds, and externally to treat sores. The mixture was also used to make poultices to be applied to the chest to treat "wasting diseases".
