= Cherry Township =

Cherry Township may refer to the following townships in the United States:

- Cherry Township, St. Louis County, Minnesota
- Cherry Township, Butler County, Pennsylvania
- Cherry Township, Sullivan County, Pennsylvania
