= Cherry Island (Michigan) =

Island in Michigan

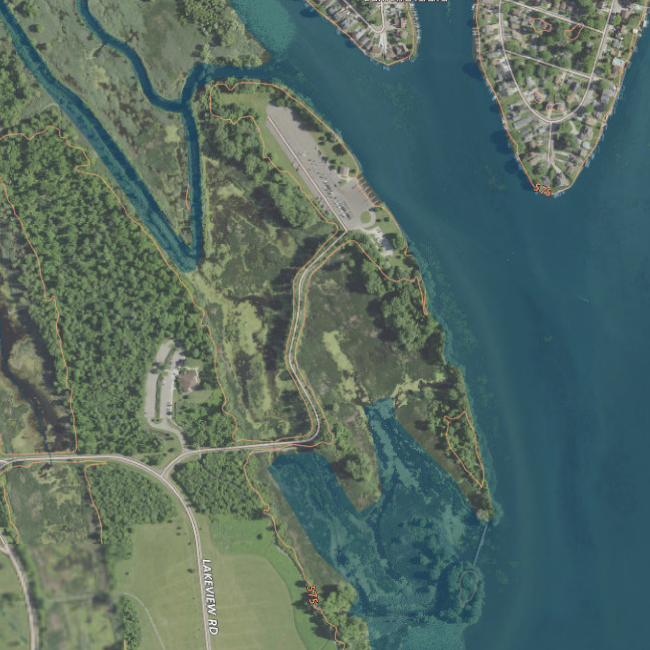
- USGS aerial imagery of Cherry Island

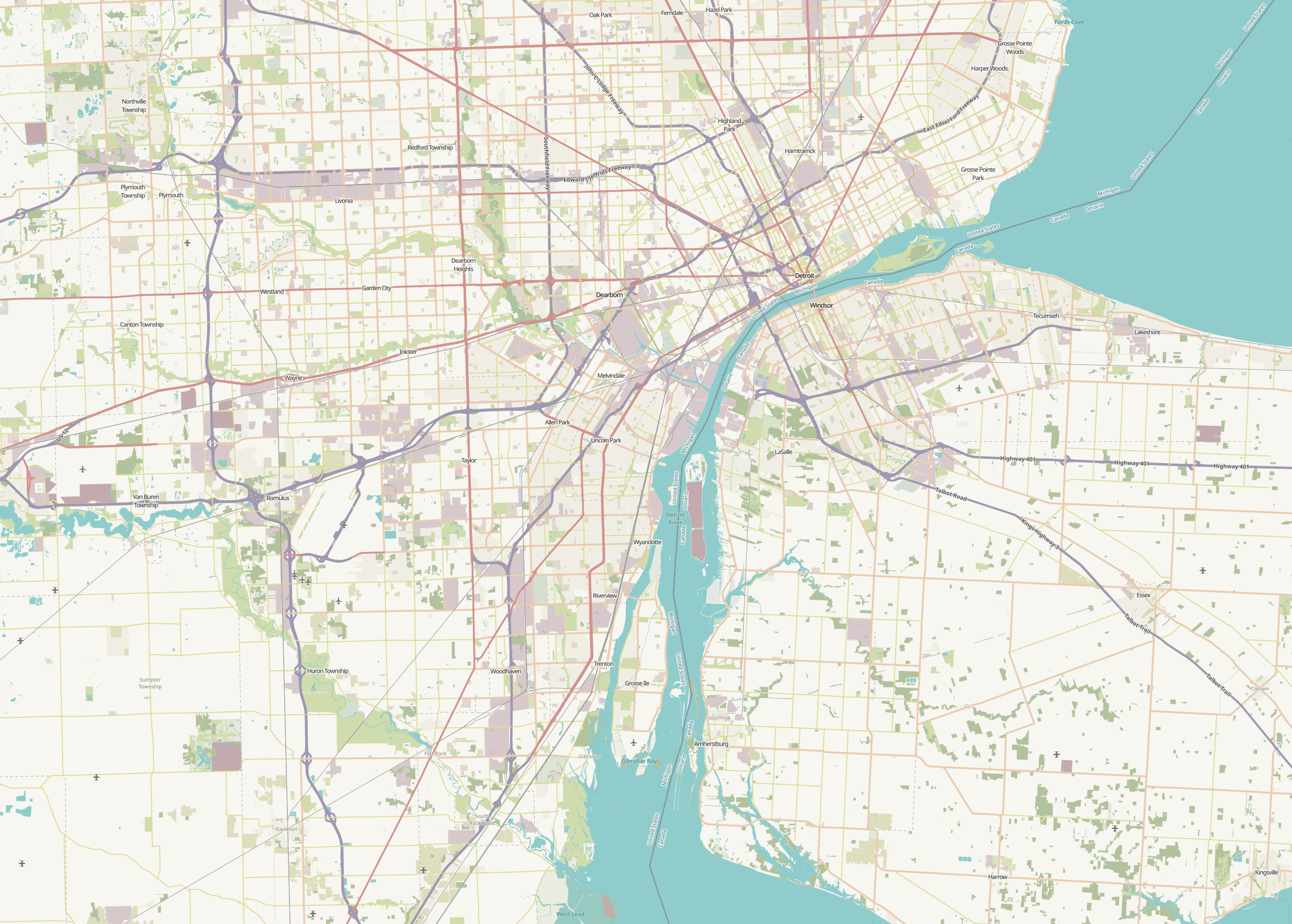
- Location within Wayne County, Michigan Location within Michigan Location within the United States

Geography
- Location: Michigan
- Coordinates: 42°04′50″N 83°11′41″W
- Highest elevation: 574 ft (175 m)

Administration
- United States
- State: Michigan
- County: Wayne

Cherry Island is an island in the Detroit River, in southeast Michigan. It is in Wayne County. Its coordinates are 42°04′50″N 83°11′41″W; the United States Geological Survey gave its elevation as 574 ft (175 m) in 1980. In 1876, it sold for $500 ($15,117 in 2025 dollars).
