= Cherry River =

Cherry River may refer to:

- Cherry River (Quebec)
- Cherry River (West Virginia)
