= Chery (surname) =

Chery or Chéry is a surname. Notable people with the surname include:

- Clementina Tina Chéry (fl. from 1978), founder of the Louis D. Brown Peace Institute
- Dieu-Nalio Chery (born 1981), Haitian photojournalist
- Jason Chery (born 1985), American football wide receiver
- Monès Chéry (born 1981), Haitian footballer
- Philippe Chéry (1759–1838), French historical and portrait painter
- Rochel Chery (born 1982), French professional basketball player
- Tjaronn Chery (born 1988), Dutch footballer
