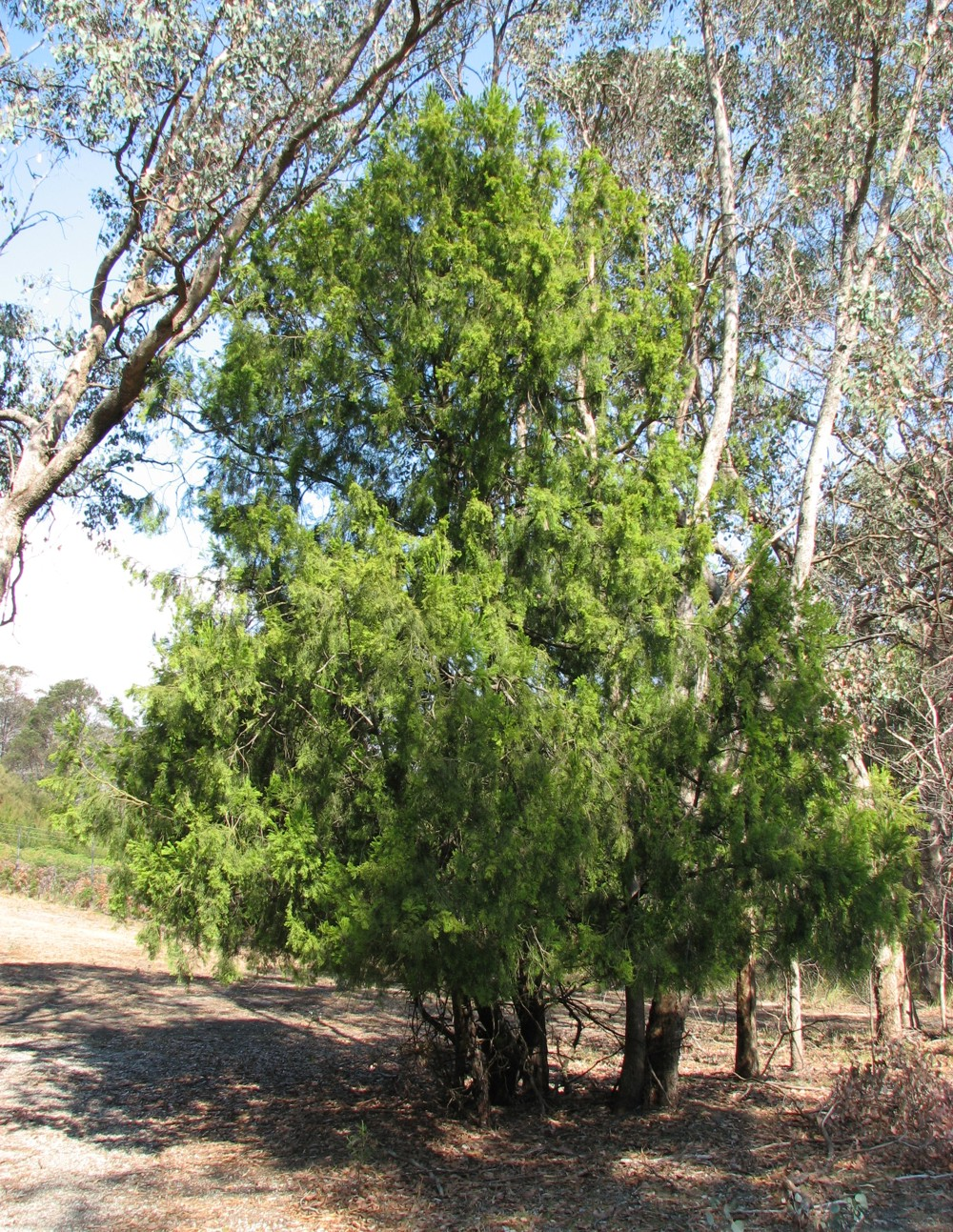
- Cherry ballart (Exocarpos cupressiformis)

Scientific classification
- Kingdom: Plantae
- Clade: Tracheophytes
- Clade: Angiosperms
- Clade: Eudicots
- Order: Santalales
- Family: Santalaceae
- Genus: Exocarpos; Labill.

Species
- See text

Synonyms
- Canopus C.Presl; Elaphanthera N.Hallé; Omphacomeria A.DC.; Sarcocalyx Zipp.; Sarcopus Gagnep.; Xylophyllos Rumph. ex Kuntze; Xynophylla Montrouz.

= Exocarpos =

Genus of flowering plants

Exocarpos (from Ancient Greek ἔξω (éxō), meaning "outside", and καρπός (karpós), meaning "fruit", and thus, "outside fruit"), also known as ballart, is a genus of flowering shrubs and small trees in the sandalwood family, Santalaceae. They range from Vietnam through Malesia, New Guinea, and Australia to New Zealand and the Pacific Islands.

They are semi-parasitic, requiring the roots of a host tree, a trait they share with many other members of the Santalaceae.

In Australia, some species are also known as ballarts or cherries.

The genus Exocarpos was first described by Jacques Labillardière on 7 May 1792:

I discovered an evergreen tree, which has its nut situated, like that of the acajou, upon a fleshy receptacle much larger than itself. I therefore named this new genus exocarpos. ... The principal characters of this plant have led me to rank it among the terebinthinaceous tribe, next to the anacardium. I have given it the name of exocarpos cupressiformis.

Convention dictates that the taxon is often expressed as Exocarpos Labill. 1798.

Within Australia, an identification key is available for New South Wales species, and for Victorian species.

== Species ==
29 species are accepted.

- Exocarpos acerbus (R.Br.) Lepschi
- Exocarpos aphyllus R.Br. – Leafless ballart, jointed cherry
- Exocarpos baumannii Stauffer
- Exocarpos bidwillii Hook.f. – New Zealand
- Exocarpos capnodioides Lepschi
- Exocarpos clavatus Stauffer
- Exocarpos cupressiformis Labill. – Cherry ballart, cypress cherry
- Exocarpos gaudichaudii A.DC. – Hulumoa (HawaiʻI)
- Exocarpos homalocladus C.Moore & F.Muell. – Grass tree
- Exocarpos humifusus R.Br.
- Exocarpos latifolius R.Br. – Broad-leaved cherry
- Exocarpos lauterbachianus Pilg.
- Exocarpos longifolius (L.) Endl.
- Exocarpos luteolus Forbes – Heau (Island of Kauaʻi in Hawaiʻi)
- Exocarpos menziesii Stauffer – Heau (Hawaiʻi)
- Exocarpos micranthus Stauffer
- Exocarpos montanus (Stauffer) Baum.-Bod.
- Exocarpos nanus Hook.f. – Alpine ballart
- Exocarpos neocaledonicus Schltr. & Pilg.
- Exocarpos odoratus (Miq.) A.DC. – Scented ballart
- Exocarpos phyllanthoides Endl.
- Exocarpos pseudocasuarina Guillaumin
- Exocarpos psilotiformis Skottsb.
- Exocarpos pullei Pilg.
- Exocarpos sparteus R.Br. – Broom ballart, slender cherry
- Exocarpos spathulatus Schltr. & Pilg.
- Exocarpos strictus R.Br. – Pale-fruit ballart, dwarf cherry
- Exocarpos syrticola (F.Muell. ex Miq.) Stauffer – Coast ballart
- Exocarpos vitiensis A.C.Sm.
