= Don Cherry (disambiguation) =

Don Cherry (born 1934) is a Canadian hockey commentator, retired player and coach.

Don Cherry may also refer to:

- Don Cherry (singer) (1924–2018), American singer and golfer
- Don Cherry (trumpeter) (1936–1995), American jazz musician
- Don Cherry (American football) (born 1994), American football linebacker
- Brown Rice (album), by trumpeter Don Cherry, 1975, reissued as Don Cherry
