= Simon Cherry =

Biomedical engineer

Simon R. Cherry is a biomedical engineer, and is currently a distinguished professor at University of California, Davis, and a published author.

In 2016, Cherry was elected as a member to the National Academy of Engineering for "development of nuclear emission imaging and magnetic resonance technologies for medical science". He was elected a Fellow of the Royal Society in 2026.
