= Cherry Creek Golf Links =

Golf club in Long Island, New York, United States

Coordinates: 40°57′46″N 72°40′49″W

- Interactive map of Cherry Creek Golf Links

Club information
- Location: Riverhead, New York
- Established: 1996
- Type: Public
- Tota holes: 18
- Website: www.cherrycreeklinks.com
- Designed by: Charles Jurgens
- Par: 73
- Length: 7187 yards
- Course rating: 73.8

Cherry Creek Golf Links is a golf club located in Riverhead on Long Island in the state of New York in the United States. Constructed on 166 acres (0.67 km^{2}) of former potato and sod farms, Cherry Creek Golf Links opened in 1996. A second course, The Woods at Cherry Creek, was added across the street in 2002.

== Geography ==
Cherry Creek Golf Links is a scenic links-style course with rolling fairways and elevated tees and greens situated in Riverhead out on the eastern end of Long Island. The course is only 1 mile (1.6 km) south from the Long Island Sound and 10 miles (16 km) north of the Atlantic Ocean which puts wind into a factor including the flat open fields and wineries that are around the course. They raised their weekend golf special fees with cart after 12 pm to $60 from $50 in 2017. The course designed by Charles Jurgens can stretch to 7187 yards with a par of 73. The fairways are generous and long with water coming into play on four of the 18 holes.

The signature hole is the 12th, a 389-yard par 4 that plays from an elevated tee to a narrow, sloping fairway with a pond on the right. The Par 6 18th Hole, which is the only par 6 in the New York Metropolitan Area stretches 644 yards when played from the tips and ties for the longest hole in the Metropolitan Area.
