= Fred Cherry =

American activist

- Born: April 15, 1926
- Died: July 30, 2003 (aged 77)
- Occupation: Anti-prostitution law activist
- Years active: 1962 - 2003

Fred Cherry (15 April 1926 – 30 July 2003) was an American activist for greater rights for janes and johns (clients of prostitutes). He gained some measure of fame as self-styled "elector of homophobia" in his fight against (in his own words) "the Organized Homosexual Conspiracy of America", who he said opposed his own fight to get his freedom to patronize prostitutes recognized as being a matter of civil rights. Cherry headed the New York group Johns and Call Girls United Against Repression.

== Activism ==
Cherry first began seeing sex workers in 1956 and started his campaign against New York State's anti-prostitution laws in 1962.

In the summer of 1964 he joined the New York City League for Sexual Freedom protesting against the anti-prostitution outside the New York Women's House of Detention in Greenwich Village. After the publicity surrounding the protest, many members of the Mattachine Society (a gay rights organisation) joined the League for Sexual Freedom. Under their influence the policies changed, and the league became an anti-prostitution organisation. This development caused Cherry to become anti-gay. He is reported to have said "If those homosexuals had not taken over the League for Sexual Freedom, the League might have achieved the decriminalization of prostitution."

Cherry had a severe disability and claimed because of this he relied solely on prostitutes for sex. In 1985, Cherry, and Margo St. James, filed a lawsuit against Ed Koch, then mayor of New York City, district attorney Elizabeth Holtzman and Police commissioner Benjamin Ward, seeking to overturn New York's laws banning prostitution on the grounds that Cherry's disability would make it impossible for him to find sexual companionship other than prostitutes, thereby violating the Equal Protection Clause of the Fourteenth Amendment to the United States Constitution. The lawsuit was dismissed.

Cherry provided funding for the incorporation of the International Sex Worker Foundation for Art, Culture and Education (ISWFACE) and its daily running costs.

== Mathematics ==
Cherry helped make mathematical history when he published, in collaboration with such distinguished combinatorialists as E.T. Parker and Walter Wallis, a construction of orthogonal pairs of doubly diagonal Latin squares of order 10, thus completing the proof that such pairs exist for all orders other than 2,3 and 6. In his words: "this accomplishment gave me a tremendous boost in my self-esteem. Before I had done this, I used to think of myself as a rich bum. Now, I can truly call myself a mathematician, even though I only have a bachelor's degree in mathematics."

== Sources ==
- American Bar Association (1986). ABA Journal. American Bar Association.
- Brown, John Wesley; Cherry, Fred; Most, Lee; Most, Mel; Parker, E. T.; Wallis, W. D. (2017). "Completion of the Spectrum of Orthogonal Diagonal Latin Squares". In Rees (ed.). Graphs, Matrices, and Designs. Routledge. ISBN 9781351444378.
- Leonard, Arthur S. (2013). Sexuality and the Law: American Law and Society. Routledge. ISBN 9781135755027.
