= John Cherry =

John Cherry may refer to:

== Politics ==
- John Cherry (Australian politician) (born 1965), former Australian senator
- John D. Cherry (born 1951), 62nd lieutenant governor of Michigan
- John Daniel Cherry (born 1985), member of the Michigan Senate

== Others ==
- John Cherry (rower) (1914–1943), English rower
- John A. Cherry (born 1942), Canadian professor of hydrogeology
- John F. Cherry, British-American Aegean prehistorian and survey archaeologist
- John Cherry (director) (1948–2022), American film director

== See also ==
- Don Cherry
