= Cherry red =

Cherry red may refer to:

== Music ==
- Cherry Red Records, a UK record label
- Cherry Red (album), 1967 album by Eddie "Cleanhead" Vinson

=== Songs ===
- "Cherry Red" (song), a 1966 song by the Bee Gees
- "Cherry Red", a 1967 song by Eddie "Cleanhead" Vinson off the eponymous album Cherry Red (album)
- "Cherry Red", a 1971 song by Groundhogs from Split
- "Cherry Red", a 1994 song by ZZ Top from Antenna
- "Cherry Red", a 2010 song by Ida Maria from Katla

== Other uses ==
- "Cherry Red" (Law & Order: Criminal Intent), an episode of Law & Order: Criminal Intent
- Cherry Red Airline, a defunct Canadian airline
- Cherry AG produces a Red variation of their keyboard switches

== See also ==
- Cerise (color), a colour, a shade of pink
- Cherry (genus Prunus), a fruit that is red
- Red cherry (disambiguation)
- Cherry (disambiguation)
- Red (disambiguation)
