= Francis Cherry =

Francis Cherry may refer to:

- Francis Cherry (governor) (1908–1965), governor of Arkansas, USA
- Francis Cherry (diplomat) (1552–1605), English ambassador to the Court of Russia, 1598–1599
- Francis Cherry (non-juror) (1665–1713), English layman and non-juror, known as a philanthropist and benefactor

== See also ==
- Frances Cherry, (born 1937), New Zealand novelist, short story writer and creative writing teacher
