= Cherry Gardens, Virginia =

Unincorporated community in Virginia, US

Coordinates: 37°28′56″N 77°27′33″W

Cherry Gardens is an unincorporated community in the City of Richmond, in the U.S. state of Virginia.
