= Red cherry (disambiguation) =

Red cherry or red cherries, may refer to:

- A ripe cherry, the fruit of the genus Prunus
- Prunus pensylvanica (red cherry, wild red cherry), a cherry found native to North America
- Red Cherry (Chinese: 紅櫻桃), a 1995 war drama film
- "Red Cherries" (song), a jump blues song by Floyd Dixon
- "Red Cherries" (single), a 2019 song and single by Young Knives

== See also ==
- Cerise (color), a colour, a shade of pink
- Blood Red Cherry (album), a 2000 studio album created by Jann Arden
- Cherry red (disambiguation)
- Cherry (disambiguation)
- Red (disambiguation)
