= Tyler Cherry =

American government official

Department of Interior Communications Director
- In office 2023–2024

Personal details
- Born: United States
- Spouse: Jakob Stronko

Tyler Cherry is a former Department of the Interior Communications Director for the Biden Administration.

== Controversy ==
During Cherry's tenure as communications director there was a controversy regarding comments they had made on Twitter saying "“Fairness means asking folks their preferred gender pronouns before assuming,” one of the screenshots shared online said. Other tweets included joking about arguing with family members over “systemic racism and police brutality”, as well as a call to “abolish ICE” [Immigration and Customs Enforcement]."

In regards to a tweet aimed at Israel, PinkNews reported that ""One tweet that has come in for particular criticism read: “Cheersing in bars to ending the occupation of Palestine – no shame and f— your glares #ISupportGaza #FreePalestine,” which Cherry sent on 25 July 2014." Other messages indicated that Cherry "adores antisemites"

Cherry later publicly apologized for the past comments and said they do not reflect his current views.

== Personal life ==
Cherry married Jakob Stronko in 2022 when at the time both worked as government employees.
