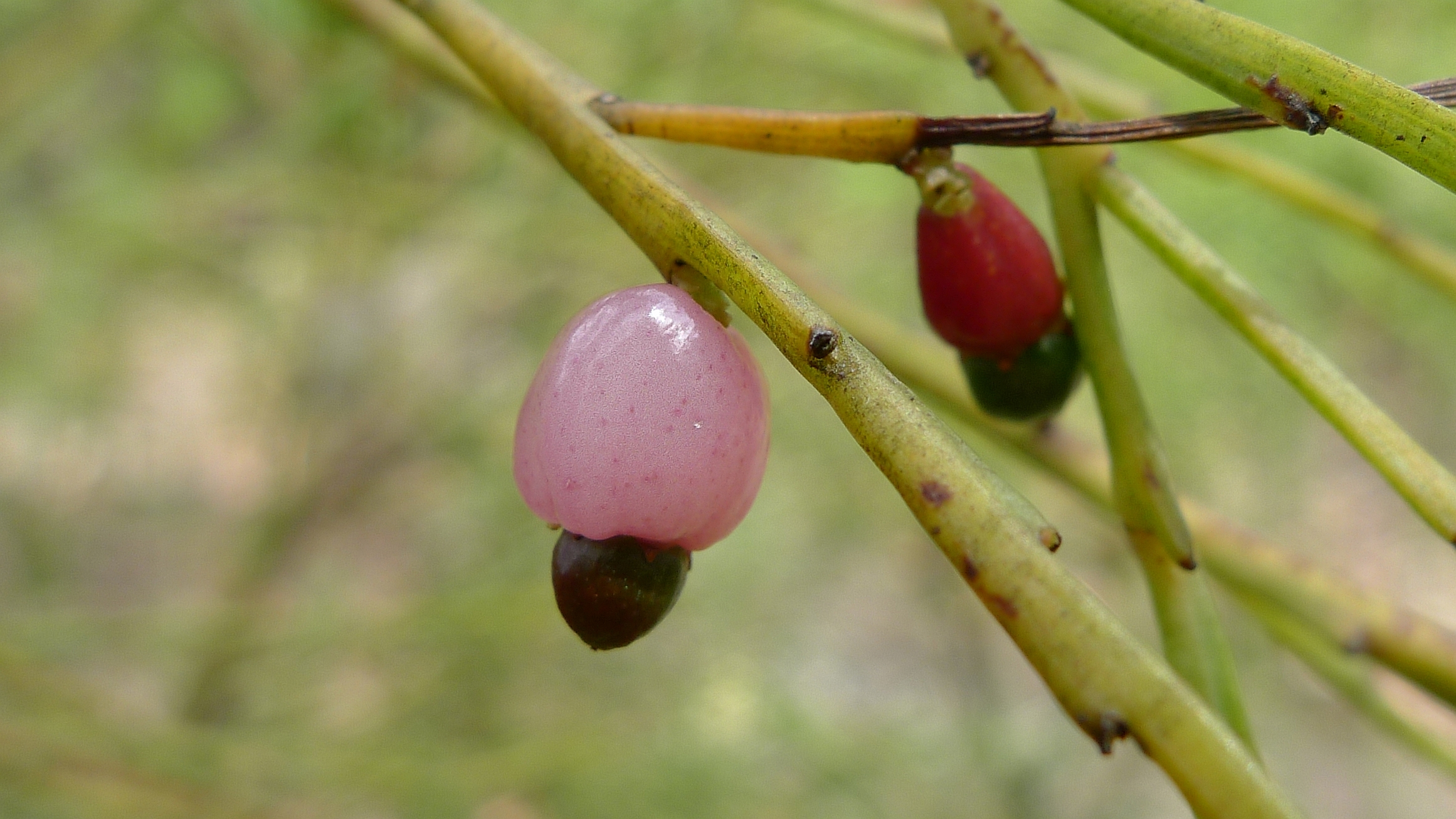

Scientific classification
- Kingdom: Plantae
- Clade: Tracheophytes
- Clade: Angiosperms
- Clade: Eudicots
- Order: Santalales
- Family: Santalaceae
- Genus: Exocarpos
- Species: E. strictus

Binomial name
- Exocarpos strictus R.Br.
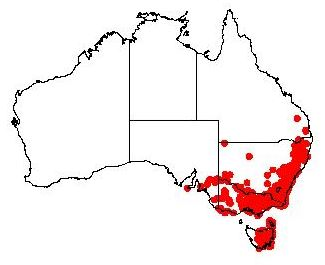
- Occurrence data from AVH

= Exocarpos strictus =

Species of plant

Exocarpos strictus, with common names pale-fruit ballart, pale ballart, and dwarf cherry, is an adaptably versatile erect shrub bearing cherry-like fruit, that forms dense thickets, that is native to parts of Australia (including Tasmania). E. strictus was described by botanist Robert Brown in 1810.

== Branches and leaves ==
Though often hairy early on, E. strictus' branches typically become fine and vertical; occasionally they become either stout or long (rarely above 3.5 m) and bending downward with the weight of their foliage and/or fruit.

Its leaves are 1 – 3 mm in length, caducous, linear, subulate, and vary in colour from light green to a bluish-green, and ashy to bronze

== Flowers ==
The flowers of E. strictus grow in little pedunculate or sessile clusters numbering 2–6. They have 4 or 5, triangular, tepals that measure about 0.5 mm long. The pedicel is 2–7 mm long, succulent, broadly obovoid, and coloured either mauve, red, or white.

E. strictus flowers all year round.

== Fruit ==
The fruit of E. strictus superficially resemble stunted cherries. They are drupes measuring 2.5 – 4 mm, are ovoid or globose, shiny, and green to purple-black in colouration.

== Distribution and occurrence ==
E. strictus grows in great numbers in all but the very wettest and driest of habitats ranging from heathland to open forests to denser woodland.

It is common in Victoria, South Australia, Queensland, New South Wales, Tasmania and the Australian Capital Territory
