= Cherry Street Bridge (Shell Rock, Iowa) =

- U.S. National Register of Historic Places
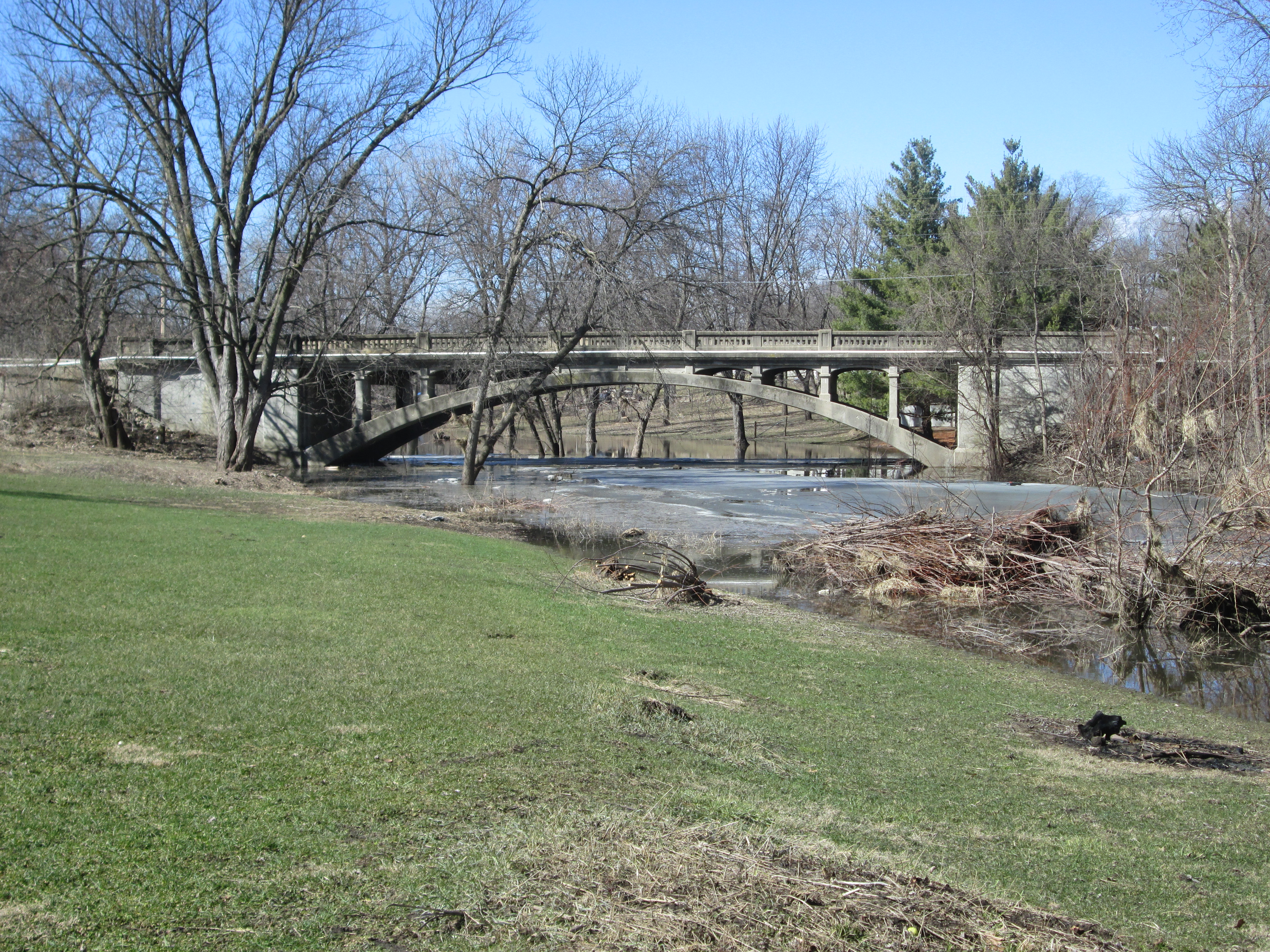

- Location within Iowa Location within the United States
- Location: Cherry St. over a tributary of the Shell Rock River; Shell Rock, Iowa
- Coordinates: 42°42′28″N 92°35′08″W
- Area: less than one acre
- Built: 1929
- Built by: A. Olson Construction Co.
- Architect: Iowa State Highway Commission
- MPS: Highway Bridges of Iowa MPS
- NRHP reference No.: 98000753
- Added to NRHP: June 25, 1998

The Cherry Street Bridge is a historic bridge located in Shell Rock, Iowa, United States. It spans a tributary of the Shell Rock River for 106 feet (32 m). The span required 544.6 cubic yards of concrete and 16,960 pounds (7,690 kg) of steel. It was built by the Waterloo, Iowa bridge contractor A. Olson Construction Co. for $15,690 and completed in August 1929. It replaced an older through truss bridge, and originally had lights on the bulkheads of the guard rails. It was listed on the National Register of Historic Places in 1998.
