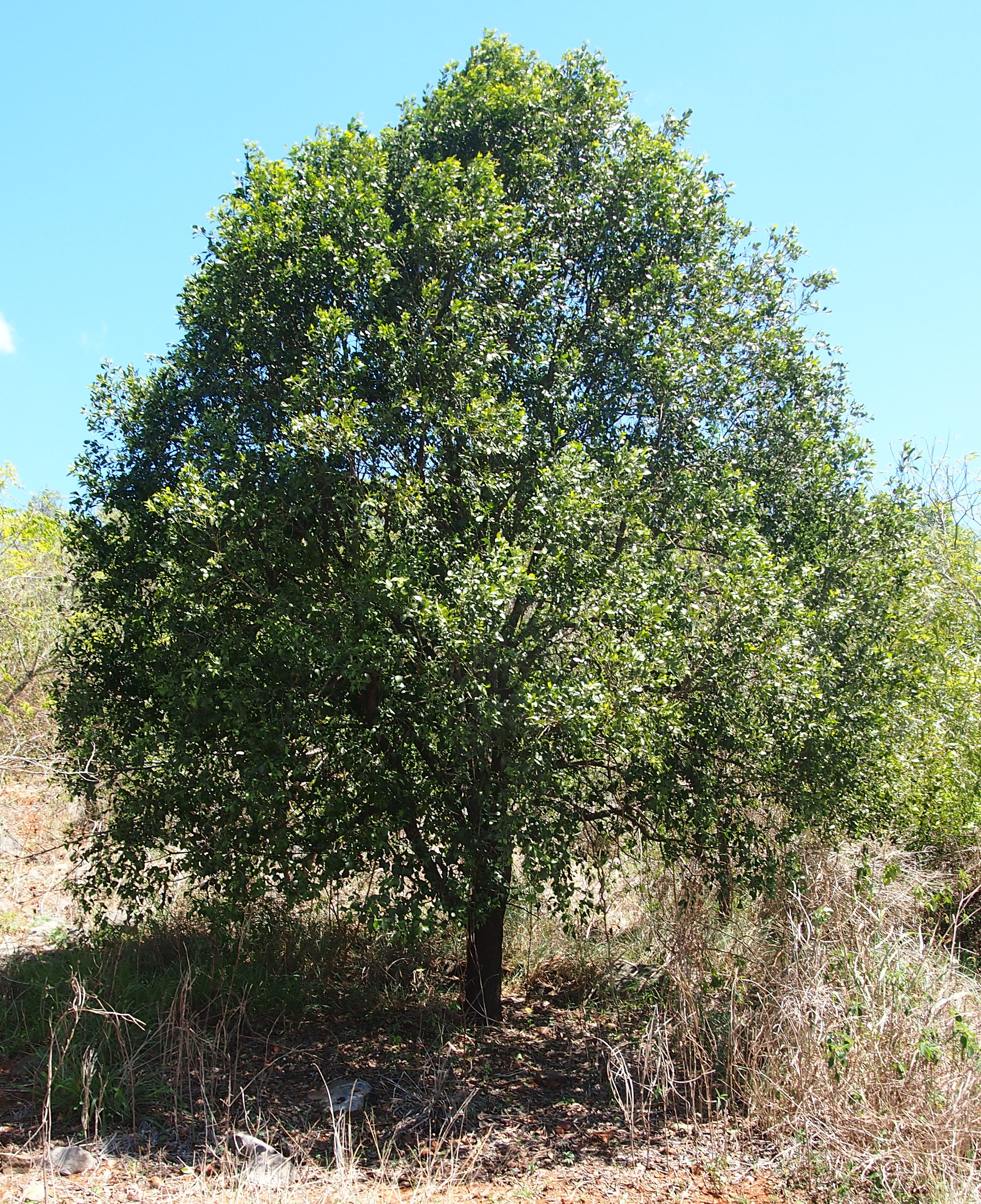

Scientific classification
- Kingdom: Plantae
- Clade: Tracheophytes
- Clade: Angiosperms
- Clade: Eudicots
- Order: Santalales
- Family: Santalaceae
- Genus: Exocarpos
- Species: E. latifolius

Binomial name
- Exocarpos latifolius R.Br.
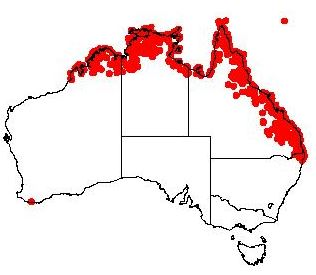
- Occurrence data from Australasian Virtual Herbarium

= Exocarpos latifolius =

Species of flowering plant

Exocarpos latifolius is a species of parasitic tree, in the family Santalaceae. It has the common names broad leaved ballart, scrub sandal-wood, scrub cherry, oringorin, broad leaved cherry or native cherry. The species is found in monsoon forest, littoral rainforest and occasionally in more open forest types in Malesia and across Northern Australia.

It is a small tree (or large shrub) growing to 10 metres tall, hemiparasitic on the roots of other trees. The leaves are approximately as broad as long, around 4 cm long. Flowers are produced in slender spikes mostly approximately 1 cm long. The fruit is a globular nut on a short stalk. As it ripens the stalk swells and turns red, like an inside out cherry. The fruit is 4–6 mm long and is inedible, though the stalk is, and was used as a traditional food source by Aboriginal Australians. The seed is found on the outside of the fruit, hence the name exocarpus, from the Latin meaning outer. The wood is very fine-grained with little figure but often striking colour variation and was historically used for cabinet work.

The tree was used for many purposes by Aboriginal Australians.The bark was used as a contraceptive. The leaves were burned to repel insects and leaves used in a solution to treat sores.

The 1889 book The Useful Native Plants of Australia records that Indigenous Australians of Queensland referred to this tree as "Oringorin". Common names included Broad-leaved "Native Cherry" and "Scrub Sandalwood". It also states that "The fruit is edible."

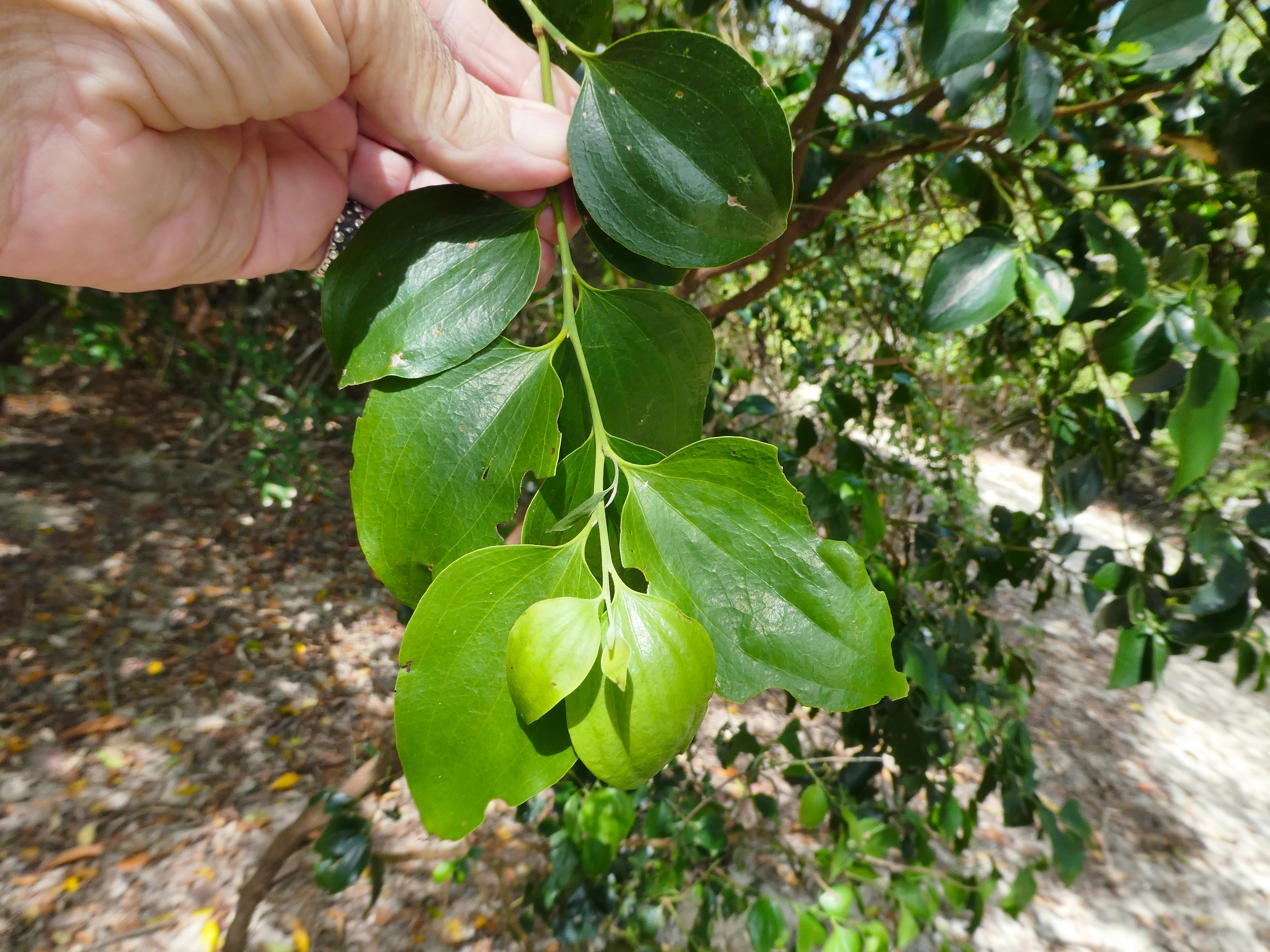
Foliage

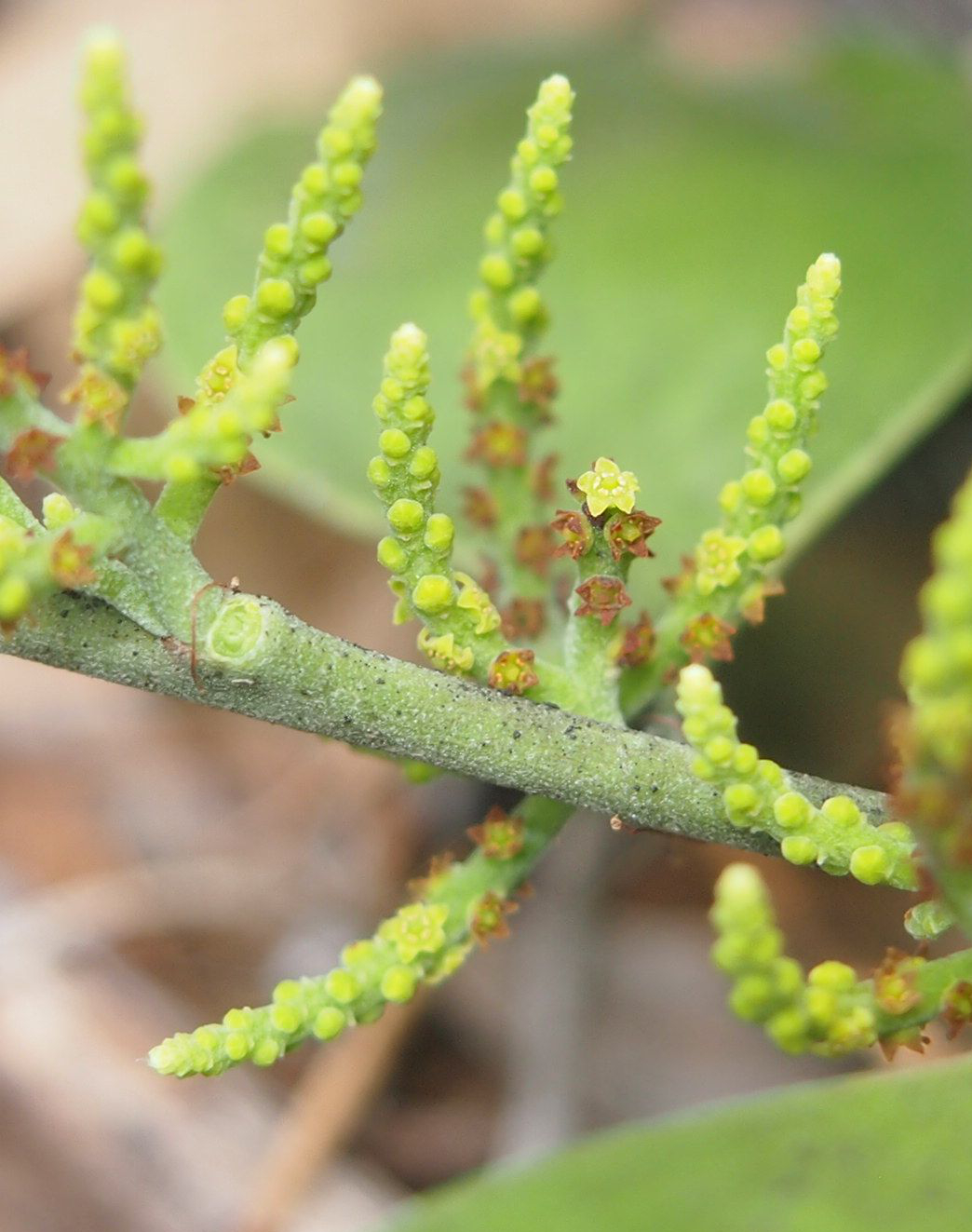
Flowers

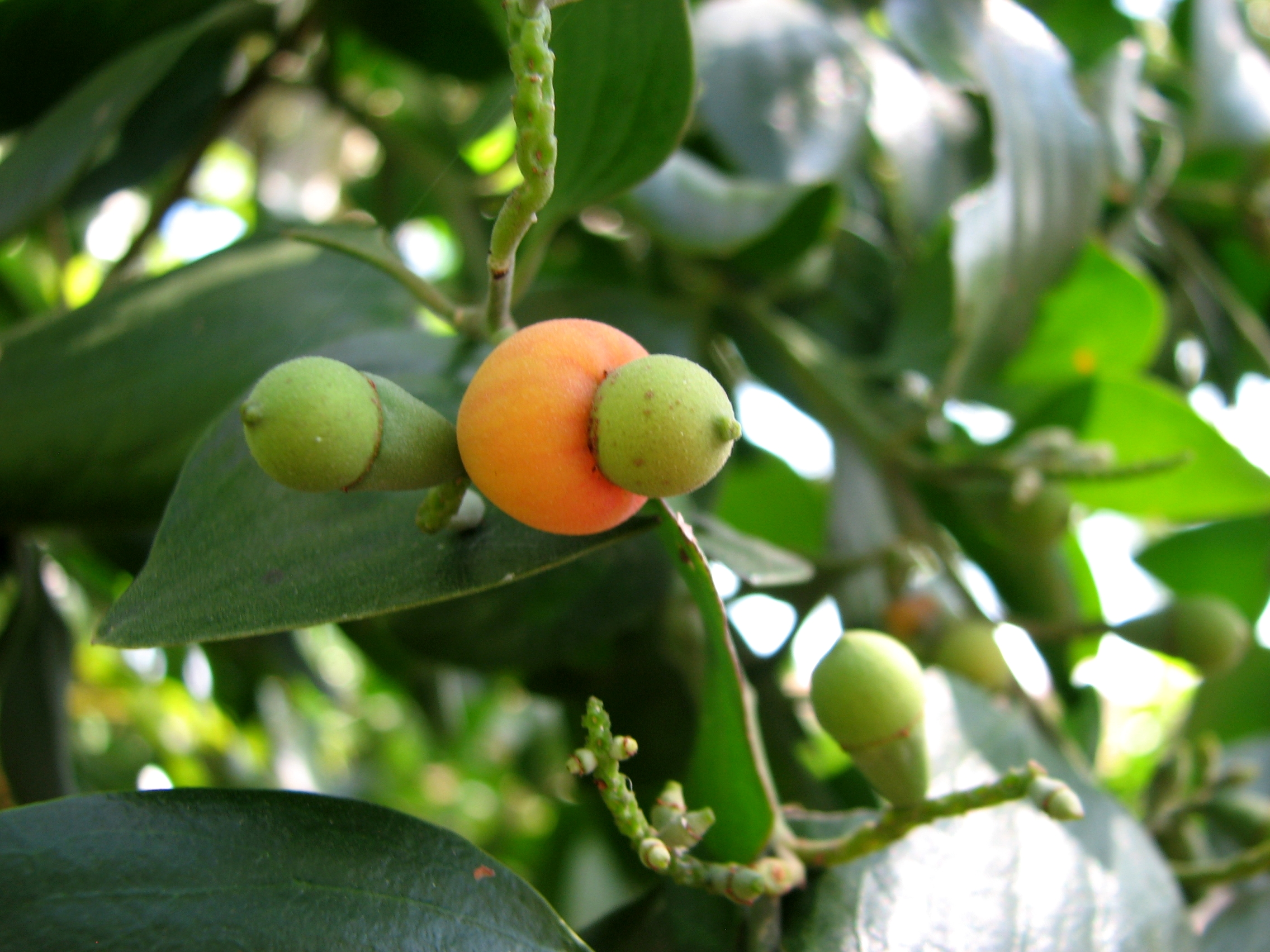
Fruit
