= Henry P. Cherry =

American politician (1823–1895)

Member of the Michigan House of Representatives from the Barry County 2nd district
- In office January 1, 1871 – 1872
- Preceded by: Adam Elliott
- Succeeded by: Gilbert Striker

Personal details
- Born: May 21, 1823 New York, US
- Died: July 17, 1895 (aged 72)
- Party: Republican

Henry Pulaski Cherry (May 21, 1823 – July 17, 1895) was a Michigan politician.

== Early life ==
Cherry was born in New York on May 21, 1823.

== Career ==
Cherry was elected to the Michigan House of Representatives on November 4, 1870. He served in this position 1871 to 1872.

== Death ==
Cherry died on July 17, 1895.
