= Caris (name) =

Caris is a given name.

== Given name ==
- Caris LeVert (born 1994), American basketball player
- Caris Roane, American writer
- Caris Sima, a pseudonym of Clara Mountcastle (1837–1908), Canadian artist and author
- Caris Tiivel, Australian model and beauty pageant winner

=== Fictional characters ===
- Caris Wooler, one of the main characters in the Ken Follett novel World Without End

== Surname ==
- Cipriano de Caris (died 1534), Catholic bishop
- George Caris (1927–2013), Australian rules footballer
- Gerard Caris (1925–2025), Dutch sculptor and artist
- Magnus Caris (born 1968), Swedish darts player
- Rene Caris (born 1999), Australian rules footballer
- Tugal Caris, 17th century French sculptor and architect

== See also ==
- El Karis, an alias of Héctor Manuel Sauceda Gamboa, Mexican cartel leader
- Caris (disambiguation)
- Carys
- Cerys
- Charis (name)
- Cari (name)
