= Glenny =

Glenny is a surname. Notable people with the name include:

- Alexander Glenny (1882–1965), British immunologist
- Alice Russell Glenny (1858–1924), American artist
- Jack and Joe Glenny (born c. 1995), twin contestants on Big Brother (British TV series) series 14
- Michael Glenny (1927–1990), British scholar of Russian studies
- Misha Glenny (born 1958), British journalist, son of Michael Glenny
- Robb W. Glenny, American pulmonologist

== See also ==
- Glenny Drive Apartments, a defunct public housing project in Buffalo, New York
- Henderson-Glenny Gadfly, a 1929 British aircraft
- Thresher & Glenny, a British tailoring company
- Glenney (disambiguation)
- Glennie, a surname
- Glenys, also Glennys and Glennis, a given name
