= Nerys =

- Pronunciation: Welsh: [ˈneˑrɪs]
- Gender: Feminine

Origin
- Origin: Welsh
- Meaning: uncertain; possibly "lady"

Other names
- Related names: Nerissa

Nerys is a Welsh feminine given name. A modern coinage, the name is possibly an elaboration of Middle Welsh ner "lord, chief" (which relates to the modern Welsh words nêr "hero" and nerth "manliness, courage") using the popular suffix -ys (found in Carys, Dilys, Gladys and Glenys). In other languages of Latin roots, Nerys also appears as a surname with equivalent connotation (and regardless of gender), always associated with a person of royalty, distinction, power and/or nobility.

== People with the name ==
- Nerys Dockery, Saint Kitts and Nevis politician and ambassador
- Nerys Evans (born 1980), Welsh politician
- Nerys Hughes (born 1941), Welsh actress
- Nerys Jefford (born 1962), British judge
- Nerys Johnson (1942–2001), Welsh artist
- Nerys Jones (born 1984), Welsh athlete

== Fictional ==
- Kira Nerys, one of the main characters in Star Trek: Deep Space Nine (Nerys is her given name)
- Nerys, a character in Doctor Who
- Nerys Bailey, a character (mother of Roger) in My Family
- Nerys Edwards, a character in Gwaith/Cartref
- Nervous Nerys, a character in Only Fools and Horses
