= Karas =

Karas may refer to:

== Places ==
- Karas Region, Namibia
- Karaš, a river in Serbia and Romania (Romanian: Caraş)
- Karas Island, an island in Sebakor Bay, West Papua, Indonesia
- Karaś, Kuyavian-Pomeranian Voivodeship, a village in north-central Poland
- Karaś, Warmian-Masurian Voivodeship, a village in north Poland
- Karaś Lake, a lake in north-east Poland

== People ==
- Karas (surname)
- Saint Karas
- Bishop Karas (1955–2002), bishop of the Coptic Orthodox Church in the United States

== Other uses ==
- Karas language
- Karas (anime) by Sato Keiichi
- PZL.23 Karaś, a mid-1930s Polish light bomber and reconnaissance aircraft
- Karas (food)

== See also ==
- Caras (disambiguation)
- Karis (disambiguation)
