= Glenney =

Glenney is a name. Notable persons with that name include:

- Brian Glenney (born 1974), American philosopher and graffiti artist
- Colleen Glenney Boggs (born 1971), humanities professor in the humanities at Dartmouth College
- Judy Glenney (born 1949), American National Weightlifting Champion and former IWF referee and coach

== See also ==
- Glennie
- Glenny
- Glenys
