= Corissa =

Corissa is a given name. Notable people with the name include:

- Corissa Vella (born 1988), Maltese footballer
- Corissa Yasen (1973–2001), American athlete

== See also ==
- Carissa (disambiguation)
