= Carissa (disambiguation) =

Carissa is a genus of shrubs.

Carissa may also refer to:

- Carissa (name), a name of Greek origin given to girls
- Carissa (Spain), an ancient town in Spain
- Carissa (Galatia), an ancient town in Galatia, Turkey
- Carissa (moth), synonym of the moth genus Batracharta in the family Erebidae
- Carissa (film), a South African coming-of-age film
- New Carissa, a merchant ship which foundered in 1999
- Carissa, a doll in the Groovy Girls doll line, by Manhattan Toy
- "Carissa", a song by Sun Kil Moon from Benji (2014)
