= Nerissa =

Nerissa may refer to:

- Nerissa (given name), a feminine given name
- Nerissa, a character in Shakespeare's play The Merchant of Venice
- Cepora nerissa, the common gull, a butterfly in the family Pieridae
- HMS Nerissa, several ships
- SS Nerissa, several ships
- Narissa, a villain character in the comic book series W.I.T.C.H. and its television adaptation
