= Sherrill =

Sherrill or Sherrills may refer to:

== Places ==
In the United States:

- Sherrill, Arkansas, in Jefferson County
- Sherrill, Iowa, in Dubuque County
- Sherrill, Missouri
- Sherrill, New York, in Oneida County; the smallest city in New York
- Sherrills Ford, NC, a small town in Catawba County
- Sherrill, Texas Austin, TX
- Sherrill, Oklahoma Lawton, OK
- Sherrill, Arizona

== People ==
=== Given name: male ===
- Sherrill Busby (1914–1960), American football player
- Sherrill David Robinson (1922–2011), American comic book artist known as Jerry Robinson
- Sherrill Halbert (1901–1991), American judge
- Sherrill Headrick (1937–2008), American professional football player
- Sherrill Milnes (born 1935), American dramatic baritone
- Sherrill Roland (born 1984), African-American artist
- Sherril Schell (1877–1964), American architectural and portrait photographer working in London
- Sherrill W. Ward (1911–1984), American Thoroughbred racehorse trainer

=== Given name: female ===
- Sherrill Cheda (1936–2008), American-Canadian librarian, feminist writer and arts administrator
- Sherrill Elizabeth Tekatsitsiakawa Katsi Cook (born 1952), Mohawk Native American midwife, environmentalist, Native American rights activist, and women's health advocate known as Katsi Cook
- Sherrill Kester (born 1978), American soccer player
- Sherrill Levitt, American woman missing since 1992
- Sherrill Slichter, American physician

=== Surname ===
- Sherrill (surname)

== See also ==
- City of Sherrill v. Oneida Indian Nation of N. Y. (2005), a U.S. Supreme Court case
- Sherrill Manufacturing
- Sheryl
- Cheryl
