= Carys =

- Pronunciation: Caris
- Gender: feminine

Origin
- Origin: Welsh
- Meaning: "loved one"

Other names
- Alternative spelling: Cerys Caris
- Related names: Caryse, Carissa, Cara, Carrie, Cheryl, Cherise

Carys is a Welsh feminine given name, formed from the stem of the Welsh word caru, "to love" (cf. third person câr "beloved friend" or "precious"), and the suffix -ys, found in such names as Dilys, Gladys, Glenys and Nerys.

This is comparable to the similar name Cheryl which like Carys also appeared circa 1900 and is a combination of Cherie (The French form of Cara which means "precious" in Latin and is cognate to Welsh "câr") and the +yl suffix common in trendy early 20th century names such as Meryl and Beryl.

Famous bearers of the name include:

- Carys Bannister (1935–2010), British neurosurgeon
- Carys Davies, British novelist and short story writer
- Carys Parry (born 1981), Welsh hammer thrower
- Carys Hawkins (born 1988), Welsh football player
- Carys Phillips (born 1992), Welsh rugby union player
- Carys Zeta Douglas (born 2003), daughter of Welsh actress Catherine Zeta-Jones and American actor Michael Douglas
- Cerys Matthews, Welsh musician and broadcaster with a regular show on BBC Radio
- Aviva Mongillo, who goes by the stage name Carys

== See also ==
- Caradoc, a related male Welsh name with medieval origins
