= Caras =

Caras may refer to:

- Caras (magazine), a Portugal-based women's magazine
- Caraș River, a river in Serbia and Romania
- Caras (tribe), an indigenous tribe living in coastal Ecuador (1-1000 CE)
- Carás, an alternate spelling of Caraz (mountain), in the Peruvian Andes
- Canadian Academy of Recording Arts and Sciences, an organization for promoting and celebrating Canadian music and artists and which conducts the Juno Awards

== People with the surname Caras ==
- Cien Caras (born 1949), ring name of Mexican professional wrestler Carmelo Reyes González
- Dos Caras (born 1951), ring name of Mexican professional wrestler José Luis Rodríguez
- Dos Caras, Jr. (born 1977), ring name of Rodríguez's son, Mexican professional wrestler and mixed martial arts fighter Alberto Rodríguez, also known as Alberto Del Rio
- Emil Caras (born 1967), Moldovan association football coach and a former player
- Ion Caras (born 1950), Moldovan association football manager
- Peter Caras (born 1941), American illustrator
- Roger A. Caras (1928–2001), American animal photographer/writer and wildlife preservationist

== See also ==
- Caris (disambiguation)
- Karas (disambiguation)
