= Thresher & Glenny =

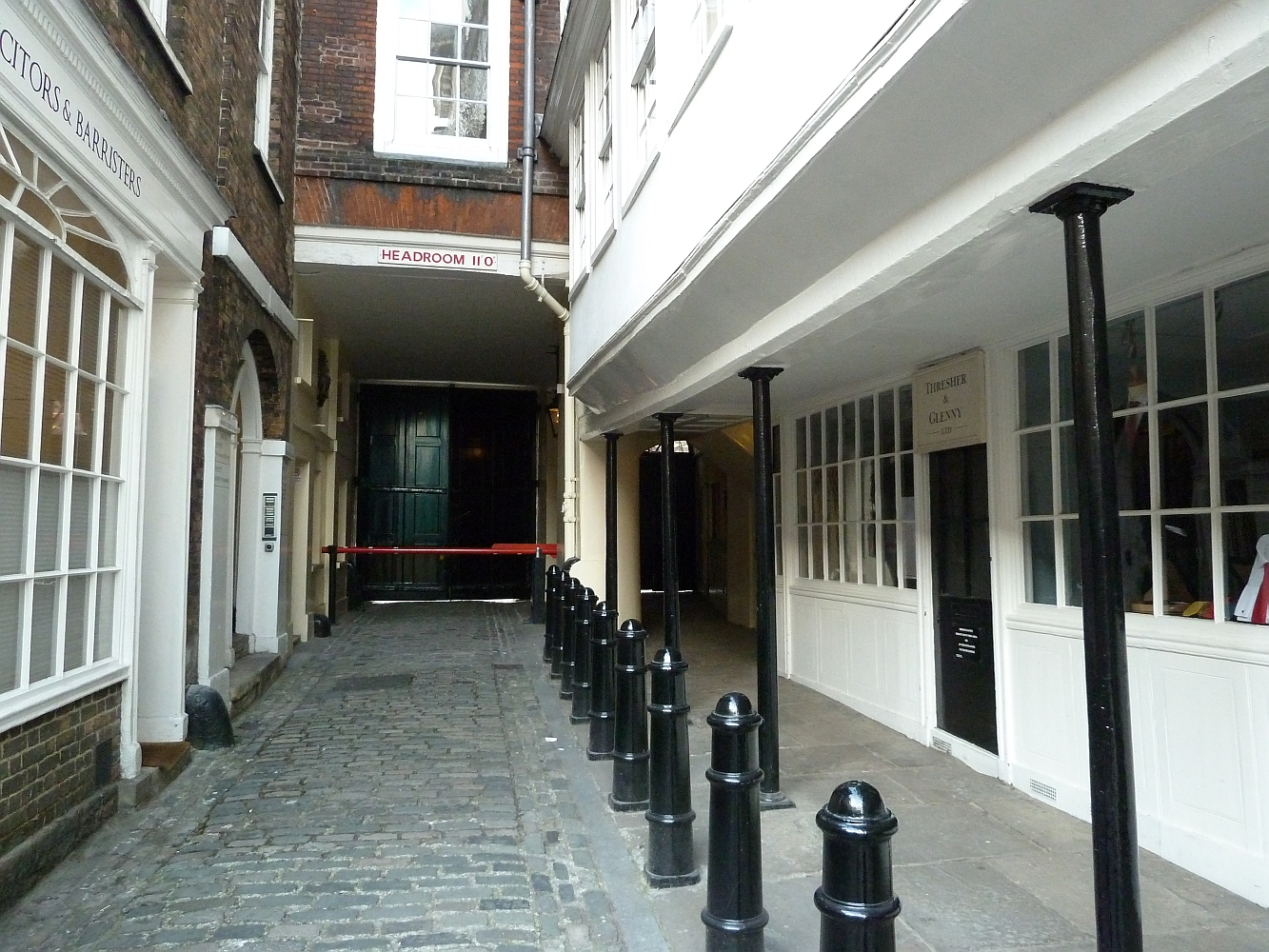
- Founded: 1755
- Headquarters: London, England
- Products: Clothing
- Services: Tailoring
- Website: www.thresherandglenny.com

Thresher & Glenny, founded in 1755, is one of the world's oldest surviving tailors, shirt makers and outfitters. The company has held Royal Warrants since the late eighteenth century and makes court attire, and bespoke and ready-for-service gentlemen's garments including suits, jackets, shirts and ties. Today the company trades through a retail outlet at 1 Middle Temple Lane, in London, England.

== History ==
The company's association with the Strand district of London dates back to its foundation. The original firm of bodice makers was established in 1755 near the Inns of Court. In 1724, the hosier Thomas Street began trading (no connection) next to the newly built St Mary-le-Strand, "where the maypole once o’erlooked the Strand". His premises occupied part of a small development of three houses and an inn (the Peacock) that had first been leased in May 1703 to Thomas Lee, citizen and merchant tailor, by the ground landlord, the Duke of Dorset. In 1749, John Thresher was advertising as being "at the Peacock next door to Somerset House in the Strand".

The firm traded as Newham and Binham in 1768; by 1777 it was known as Newham and Thresher of 152 the Strand. By 1784, the business was taken over by Richard Thresher, and became official hosier to George III in 1790. Richard Thresher remained a partner until 1805 when George Thresher replaced him, and in 1817 the company was taken over by John Thresher. John Thresher traded as a hosier, mercer and masquerade maker in Panton Street, Haymarket between 1822 and 1835, and in 1827 described himself as "hosier, glover and flannel draper to His Majesty".

By the early years of Queen Victoria’s reign, the company adverts read, "Thresher Son and Glenny, hosiers to the Queen, Outfitters and Ready-made Linen warehouse, 152, Strand". In 1854 an outpost of the firm was established at Kadikoi, "between Balaklava and the Camp, for securing safe custody and punctual delivery of parcels to the Army in the Crimea". In 1878, the firm supplied canvas shoes dyed with ink for officers embarking for the Afghan War. In 1901 the firm traded as Henry John Glenny "Indian and Colonial Outfitter".

The Thresher and Glenny partnership was cemented by marriage over several generations, through which the Glenny name became predominant. The last family member involved in the firm, Henry Glenny, died in 1936, by which time the company had extended its operations to Clifford Street, Savile Row, Conduit Street, Mayfair and Gracechurch Street in the City of London.

== Clientele ==
Military, naval and colonial officers made up a large part of the company's clientele at the height of the British Empire, and a number of specialist items were developed for their specific purposes, including ‘Indian Gauze waistcoats’, and luggage for the transport of Thresher & Glenny clothing around the world. Luggage was an important part of the company's business throughout the nineteenth and early twentieth centuries, most probably through the acquisition of the business and trade book of Nicholas Ager Hoskins, trunk maker and dealer in brass and portable furniture. Thresher & Glenny designed overland trunks for journeys to India, as well as trunks that were custom made to fit the cabins of P&O’s steamships to Malta, Alexandria and India. P&O’s information leaflets advised that the only regulation trunks for their vessels were supplied by Thresher & Glenny. Other inventions included the trenchcoat worn by British army officers during the 1914-1918 war (a claim also made by Aquascutum). The company made over 28,000 trenchcoats over the course of the war, retaining in the 1930s a list of the first 15,000 purchasers, with their regiments.

Nelson is the subject of the most famous anecdote regarding the firm:

Nelson in 1797 lost his arm in a fight with a treasure ship off Santa Cruz. On his next visit to London he called upon Mr Thresher at the Sign of the Peacock, from whom he was accustomed to buying large quantities of silk stockings. Mr Thresher naturally hastened to express regret for the loss of the arm, but Nelson cut him short: ‘Tut, tut man; damn lucky for you it wasn’t my leg. I want another dozen pairs of silk stockings.'

== Royal Warrants ==
Thresher & Glenny currently holds a Royal Warrant as shirt makers to the Royal Household, and the company has original Royal Warrants dating back to George III in 1783.

On the occasion of King William IV’s coronation in 1833, The Standard noted that the outside of Thresher & Glenny’s was illuminated with ‘a splendid crown’.

== Legal wigs ==
In 2003, The Independent reported on the consultation on abandoning the use of ceremonial wigs in English law courts, writing that Thresher & Glenny took "a week to make three barrister's wigs" using horsehair from Argentina. The article predicted that the firm would oppose the abolition of wigs.

== See also ==
- Turnbull & Asser
- Arckiv
- Biba
- Anna Valentine
