= Cheryle =

Cheryle is a feminine given name, a variant of Cheryl.

- Cheryle Chagnon-Greyeyes, Canadian politician
- Cheryle Perkins, American politician
- Cheryle Terrell
- Lynda Cheryle Lyon
- Cheryle Peel, British judoka

== See also ==
- Sheryl
