= Glennie =

Glennie is a surname. Notable people with the surname include:

- Alick Glennie (1925—2003), British computer scientist
- Alison Glennie, British actress
- Angus Glennie, Lord Glennie (born 1950), Scottish judge
- Bill Glennie (1924—2005), Canadian ice hockey player
- Bobby Glennie (born 1957), Scottish footballer
- Brian Glennie (1946–2020), Canadian ice hockey player
- Charlotte Glennie (born c.1972), New Zealand journalist
- Ernest Glennie (c.1871—1908), New Zealand rugby union player
- Evelyn Glennie (born 1965), Scottish musician
- George Glennie (1902–1998), American football player
- Irvine Glennie (1892—1980), Royal Navy officer
- Jim Glennie (born 1963), British musician
- Scott Glennie (born 1991), Canadian ice hockey player
- William Glennie (1761—1828), British teacher

== See also ==
- John Stuart Stuart-Glennie (1841—1910), British folklorist
- Great Glennie Island, a small island in the Glennie group of islands off the west coast of Wilsons Promontory, Victoria, Australia
- Glenney (disambiguation)
- Glenny (disambiguation)
- Glenys, also Glennys and Glennis, a given name
