= Cery =

Cery may refer to:

- Hospital of Cery, psychiatric hospital of the University Hospital of Lausanne (Switzerland).

== Name ==
- Denis Čery, Slovak football midfielder.

== See also ==
- Cerys
