= Stonecroft =

Stonecroft may refer to:

in Canada

- Stonecroft, Niverville, Manitoba, a development

in the United States

- Stonecroft (Birmingham, Alabama), listed on the National Register of Historic Places in Birmingham, Alabama
- Shubel Smith House, Ledyard, Connecticut, known also as Stonecroft, listed on the National Register of Historic Places, in New London County
- Stonecroft Homes LLC (Louisville, KY), A Southern Living Custom Builder Member since 2008

== See also ==
- Stonecroft Ministries
