= Valerie King (disambiguation) =

Valerie King may refer to:

- Valerie King, Canadian and American computer scientist
- Valerie King, pseudonym of romance novelist Caris Roane
- Valerie King, flutist for hip-hop band Novakane
- Valerie King, assistant coach of Wright State Raiders women's basketball
- Valerie King, candidate in the Sheffield City Council election, 1988
- Valerie King, fictional character in the 1943 film Passport to Suez
- Valerie King, fictional character in the television series Secrets and Words
