= Cherelle =

Cherelle and Cherrelle is a feminine given name, a variant of the name Cheryl, and a surname.

Notable people with the name include:

== Given name ==
Cherelle

- Cherelle Khassal (born 1991), Irish footballer
- Cherelle Parker (born 1973), Democratic politician
- Cherelle Thompson (born 1992), Trinidad and Tobago swimmer

Cherrelle

- Cherrelle (born 1958), American singer
- Cherrelle Brown (born 1986), English boxer
- Cherrelle Fennell (born 1986), British female artistic gymnast
- Cherrelle Garrett (born 1989), American bobsledder

== Surname ==
- Steve Cherelle (born 1970), English country and folk music singer and songwriter
