= Vella (surname) =

Vella is a surname. Notable people with the surname include:

== Surnames ==
- Adam Vella, (born 1971), Australian shooter and Olympic medalist
- Alex Vella (born 1953), Maltese-Australian businessman and former boxer
- Christina Vella (1942–2017), American historian of modern Europe
- Corissa Vella (born 1988), Maltese footballer
- Cristian Vella (born 1978), Argentine footballer
- Daniel J. Vella (born 1955), Canadian racehorse trainer
- George William Vella (born 1942), Maltese politician
- Gianni Vella (1885–1977), Maltese artist
- John Vella (1950–2025), American football player
- Joseph Vella (1942–2018), Maltese composer
- Karmenu Vella (born 1950), Maltese politician
- Leandro Vella (born 1996), Argentine footballer
- Lolly Vella (1933–2012), Australian soccer player
- Luciano Vella (born 1981), Argentine footballer
- Margot Vella (born 1999), Australian dual-code rugby player
- Marjanu Vella (1927–1988), Maltese poet
- Michael Vella (born 1980), Australian professional rugby league player
- Philip Vella, Maltese composer
- Silvio Vella (born 1967), Canadian soccer player
- Simon Vella (born 1979), Maltese international football player
- Vinny Vella (1947–2019), American actor and comedian

== People with first name ==
- Vella Pillay (1923–2004), South African economist and political activist
