= Mikhail Tsakni =

Military commander for the Russian Empire

Ataman Mikhail Argirevich Tsakni
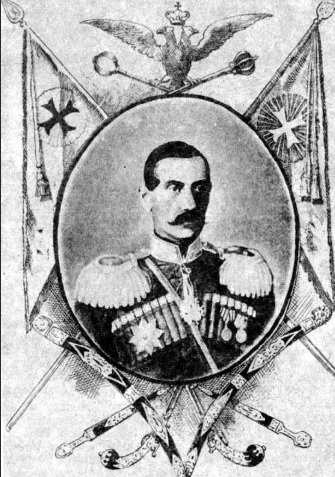
- Lieutenant-General Mikhail Tsakni
- Born: 1818; Kadikoi, Taurida Governorate, Russian Empire
- Died: May 29, 1886 (aged 67–68) Taurida Governorate, Russian Empire
- Allegiance: Russian Empire
- Branch: (Russian Empire) Imperial Russian Army
- Service years: 1834–1873
- Rank: Lieutenant-General
- Commands: Kuban Cossacks (1869–1873)
- Conflicts: Caucasian War, Crimean War
- Awards: Order of Saint Anna I, III class; Order of Saint Stanislaus I, II class; Order of Saint Vladimir II, IV class

Mikhail Tsakni (Russian: Михаил Аргирьевич Цакни) was a military commander for the Russian Empire, Ataman of the Kuban Cossacks and governor of the Kuban Oblast.

He was born to a Greek family in Kadikoi, Crimea, his father Argini Tsakni was a lieutenant in the Imperial Russian Army, part of the Greek Battalion of Balaklava. The Greeks of the area were descendants of migrants resettled in Crimea from the so-called "Archipelago Principality" (Russian: Архипелагское великое княжество). The Greeks and Albanians resettled in Kadikoi after the 1783 annexation of Crimea and the expulsion of the local Crimean Tatars.

Tsakni entered service in 1834 as a non-commissioned officer in the former Nasheburgsky Infantry Regiment (Russian: Нашебургский пехотный полк), which after its dissolution was transferred to a battalion near on the Black Sea. In the Crimean war he served along the coast of the Sea of Azov and participated in campaign on shores of the Ottoman Empire.

During the Caucasian war, in 1858 he served as a duty officer at the frontline. In 1861, he became chief of staff of the Kuban Cossack Host, in 1862, assistant to the quartermaster general of the Caucasian Army, in 1865, assistant to the commander of the Kuban Oblast, and then, in 1869, acting ataman and governor of Kuban Oblast from 1869 to 1873.

In 1873, a dispute in Poltavskaya broke out over land rights. Before the riot land in the village was held collectively, with Cossacks owning private land outside the village borders. Various times land surveyors tried to assign lands to individual families, with the remaining land going to the Kuban Oblast administrators. Since there wasn't enough land for everyone, Tsakni suggested moving 49 families to other villages. Since the villagers refused, in spring 1873 an army detachment was sent to the village by Tsakni, to forcibly resettle the villages elsewhere as a punishment.

Tsakni was forced into early retirement 1873 due to being excessive in dealing with the dispute and resettled back to Crimea. He died on May 29, 1886, and was buried in the cemetery near Church of the Holy Trinity in Kadikoi.

== Awards ==
- Order of Saint Anna I, III class
- Order of Saint Stanislaus I, II class
- Order of Saint Vladimir II, IV class
- Insignia of Immaculate Service (20 years)
- Bronze Medal with Ribbon of Saint George "In memory of the Crimean war 1853–1856"
- Cross "For Service in the Caucasus"
- Medal "For the Conquest of the Western Caucasus"

Preceded by Felix Sumarokov-Elston	Ataman of the Kuban Cossacks; 1869–1873	Succeeded by Nikolai Karmalin
