= Carissa (name) =

- Gender: Female

Origin
- Origin: Greek
- Meaning: Grace, beloved
- Region of origin: Greece

Other names
- Related names: Cara, Carys, Carina, Cheryl

Carissa (Greek: Καρισσα, also transliterated as Charissa or Karissa) is a feminine given name of Greek origin derived from Greek χαρις (charis) meaning "grace", or the Latin for "beloved." In the epic poem "The Faerie Queene" (1590) by English poet Edmund Spenser, the character Charissa personifies "charity". (Note: The other women in the House of Holiness are Fidelia (faith) and Speranza (hope).)

Related names in other languages include Cara (Irish, Italian), Carys (Welsh), Cherie (French and English), and Cheryl (English).

Notable people with the name Carissa include:

- Carissa Gump (born 1983), American weightlifter
- Carissa Moore (born 1992), Hawaiian American Olympian
- Carissa Phelps (born 1976), American author
- Carissa Putri (born 1984), Indonesian actress
- Carissa Rodriguez (born 1970), American artist
- Carissa Springett (born 1997 or 1998), Thai actress
- Carissa Tombs (born 1969), former Australian netball player
- Carissa Turner (born 1989), Welsh badminton and Australian rules football player
- Carissa Véliz, Mexican, Spanish and British philosopher
- Carissa Walford, Australian TV presenter
- Carissa Wilkes (born 1986), New Zealand road cyclist
- Carissa Yip (born 2003), American chess player

== See also ==
- Clarissa (given name)
- Karissa
