= Karissa =

Karissa is a given name. Notable people with the name include:

- Karissa Boudreau (died 2008), Canadian murder victim
- Karissa Cook, American volleyball player
- Karissa Sanbonmatsu, American biologist
- Karissa Schweizer, American runner
- Karissa Whitsell, American cyclist
- Karissa and Katie Strain, Canadian actresses

== See also ==
- Clarissa (given name)
- Carissa (name)
