= British Educational Research Association =

- British Educational Research Association
- Abbreviation: BERA
- Formation: 1974
- Founded at: United Kingdom
- Location: United Kingdom
- Fields: Research
- Official language: English
- Website: www.bera.ac.uk

The British Educational Research Association (BERA) is a membership association and learned society committed to advancing research quality, building research capacity and fostering research engagement. BERA's aim is to inform the development of policy and practice by promoting the best quality evidence produced by educational research.

== History ==
Founded in 1974, BERA has since expanded into an internationally renowned association with over 3,000 members. BERA is not discipline-specific and has members from a wide range of disciplinary backgrounds, theoretical orientations, methodological approaches, sectoral interests and institutional affiliations.

BERA holds a major international conference each year alongside a series of events, and publishes high quality research in peer-reviewed journals, reports, book series and the BERA Blog. BERA has an array of awards and fellowships, provides grants for research, support the career development of educational researchers and creates an active peer community organised around networks, forums and special interest groups.

BERA is a registered charity and is governed by an elected council, with its president serving a two-year term, and managed by a small office team based in London.

BERA holds conferences, publishes research, and pays for research. Their publications includes: "reports of experiments and surveys, discussions of conceptual and methodological issues and of underlying assumptions in educational research, accounts of research in progress, and book reviews."

== Publications and awards ==
=== Publications ===
- Research Intelligence
- British Educational Research Journal
- British Journal of Educational Technology
- Review of Education
- The Curriculum Journal
- BERA Ethical Guidelines

They have irregularly published material, and discontinued material that can be purchased from some book companies.

=== Awards and funding ===
- BERA Small Grants Fund
- BERA Equality in Education Award
- BERA Academic Citizen of the Year
- Educational Book of the Year
- BERA Public Engagement and Impact Award
- BERA Undergraduate Award
- BERA Doctoral Thesis Award
- BERA Masters Dissertation Award
- BERA Brian Simon Fund
- BERA Doctoral Fellowship
- BERA John Nisbet Fellowship
- BCF Curriculum Investigation Grant
- BJET Fellowship
- BERJ Editor's Choice Award
- Curriculum Journal Editor's Choice Award
- Review of Education Editor's Choice Award
- Conference Best Paper Awards
