= Cheryl Brown (educator) =

Professor of education in New Zealand

- Born: Cheryl Lee Brown

Academic background
- Education: University of Cape Town
- Thesis: Excavating the meaning of information and communication technology use amongst South African university students : a critical discourse analysis (2011)

Cheryl Lee Brown is a South African–New Zealand education academic who has worked in education in South Africa, Australia and New Zealand. She is a full professor at the University of Canterbury, specialising in the use of technology in education, digital literacy and access to technology.

== Academic career ==
Brown completed a PhD titled Excavating the meaning of information and communication technology use amongst South African university students: a critical discourse analysis at the University of Cape Town. Brown then worked in the Centre for Innovation in Learning and Teaching at the University of Cape Town. Brown has worked in education in South Africa, Australia and New Zealand. Brown joined the faculty of the University of Canterbury, rising to full professor in 2024. As of 2024, Brown is Head of the School of Educational Studies and Leadership. With Kathryn MacCallum, Brown is a co-leader of the University of Canterbury's Digital Futures Lab.

Brown's research focuses on the role of technology in education, including phones and laptops. She covers topics such as whether access to devices impacts students' digital literacy, and the impact of screen time at home and school on children's learning. Brown argues that there is 'good' and 'bad' screentime and the focus should be less on limiting the amount and more about ensuring that children are actively engaged in learning. MacCallum and Brown have also argued that rather than banning cellphones from schools, a National Party policy announced in 2024, schools should instead be supported to better integrate digital learning and wellbeing. Brown has also been part of a national research project looking at the affordability of textbooks in New Zealand, and student attitudes to textbook prices.

== Selected works ==
- Brown, Cheryl Lee; Czerniewicz, Laura (2010). "Debunking the 'digital native': beyond digital apartheid, towards digital democracy". Journal of Computer Assisted Learning. 26 (5): 357–369. doi:10.1111/j.1365-2729.2010.00369.x. Wikidata Q124655891.
- Czerniewicz, Laura; Brown, Cheryl Lee (2009). "A study of the relationship between institutional policy, organisational culture and e-learning use in four South African universities". Computers and Education. 53 (1): 121–131. doi:10.1016/j.compedu.2009.01.006. Wikidata Q124655895.
- Dick Ng'ambi; Cheryl Brown; Vivienne Bozalek; Daniela Gachago; Denise Wood (2016). "Technology enhanced teaching and learning in South African higher education – A rearview of a 20 year journey". British Journal of Educational Technology. 47 (5): 843–858. doi:10.1111/bjet.12485. Wikidata Q124655887.
- Czerniewicz, Laura; Brown, Cheryl Lee (2012). "The habitus of digital "strangers" in higher education". British Journal of Educational Technology. 44 (1): 44–53. doi:10.1111/j.1467-8535.2012.01281.x. Wikidata Q124655889.
- Karin de Jager; Brown, Cheryl Lee (2010). "The tangled web: investigating academics' views of plagiarism at the University of Cape Town". Studies in Higher Education. 35 (5): 513–528. doi:10.1080/03075070903222641. Wikidata Q124655894.
- Brown, Cheryl Lee; Czerniewicz, Laura; Travis Noakes (2015). "Online content creation: looking at students' social media practices through a Connected Learning lens". Learning, Media and Technology. 41 (1): 140–159. doi:10.1080/17439884.2015.1107097. Wikidata Q124655886.
