= Sheryl =

- Gender: Female

Origin
- Origin: German

Other names
- Related names: Cheryl

Sheryl is a female given name. The similar name Sherill may be male or female.

Notable people named Sheryl, Sheryll or Sheryle include:

== Business ==
- Sheryl Handler (born 1955), American businesswoman (Thinking Machines, Ab Initio Software)
- Sheryl Sandberg (born 1969), American businesswoman, chief operating officer of Facebook since 2008

== Film and television ==
- Sheryl Braxton, contestant on Big Brother 2 (U.S.)
- Sheryl Cruz (born 1974), Filipina actress
- Sheryl Gascoigne (born 1965), British television personality and author
- Sheryl Leach (born 1952), American creator of children's show Barney and Friends
- Sheryl Lee (born 1967), American actress
- Sheryl Lee Ralph (born 1955), American actress and singer
- Sheryl Munks (born 1965), Australian actress
- Sheryl Wheeler (1960–2020), American stuntwoman
- Sheryll Anne Alonzo Yutadco, contestant on Pinoy Big Brother (season 1)
- Sheryl Zohn (fl. 2000s–2020s), American television writer and producer

== Music ==
- Sheryl Bailey, American jazz musician and educator
- Sheryl Cooper, a dancer and stage performer and wife of the rock star Alice Cooper
- Sheryl Crow, American singer, songwriter and musician

== Politics ==
- Sheryl Allen, American politician and educator
- Sheryl Davis Kohl, Representative in the Maryland House of Delegates
- Sheryll Murray (born 1956), British Member of Parliament
- Sheryl Williams Stapleton, majority whip in the New Mexico House of Representatives

== Sport ==
- Sheryl Johnson, former American field hockey player
- Sheryl Morgan, Jamaican sprinter
- Sheryl Scanlan, New Zealand International netball player
- Sheryl Swoopes, American professional basketball player

== Writers ==
- Sheryl Berk (fl. 2000s–2010s), American writer
- Sheryl Gay Stolberg (born 1961), American journalist
- Sheryl McFarlane, Canadian author
- Sheryl St. Germain, American poet and professor
- Sheryl WuDunn, Chinese-American journalist

== Other professions ==
- Sheryll Cashin, American law professor and writer
- Sheryl Underwood (born 1963), African-American comedian, actress and television host
- Sheryl van Nunen, Australian allergy researcher and immunologist
- Sheryl Sims, American quilter

== Fictional characters ==
- Sheryl Nome, character from the anime series Macross Frontier
- Sheryl Whalen, character from the television series Baywatch, played by Ingrid Walters
- Sheryl Yoast, character from the movie Remember the Titans, played by Hayden Panettiere
- Sheryl Ann DuJean, a character from the movie Ruby, played by Sherilyn Fenn

== See also ==
- Cheryl
- Sherrill (surname)
