= Judy Glenney =

American weightlifter (born 1949)

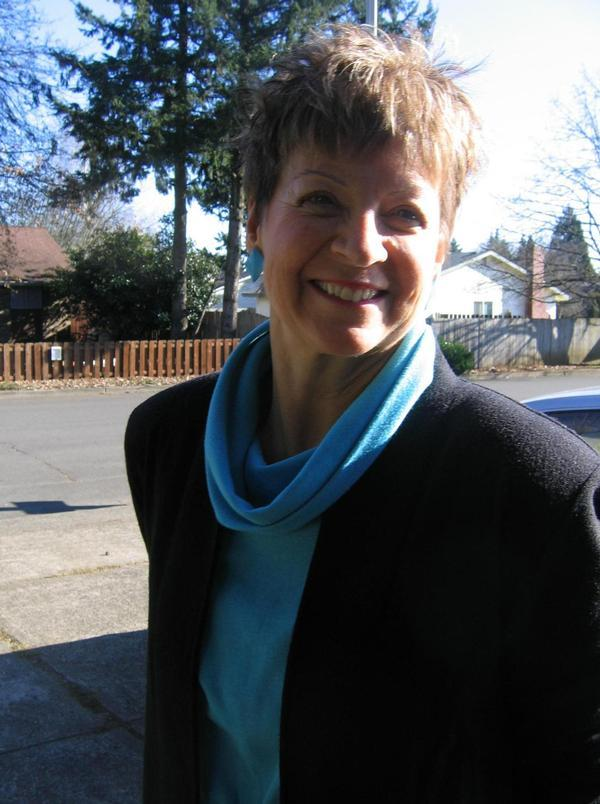
- Born: Judith Ann Glenney; March 15, 1949 (age 77); Portland, Oregon, U.S.
- Education: Pacific University
- Occupations: Teacher, Motivational speaker, Weightlifter, Referee
- Employer: Clark College
- Spouse: Gary Glenney

Judy Glenney (born March 15, 1949) is an American National Weightlifting Champion and former IWF referee and coach. She is noted for her influence as a pioneer in women's weightlifting. Glenney has been recognized as the strongest woman in history based on her accomplishments throughout her career in professional competitive powerlifting.

== Lifting career ==
Judy began lifting unofficially against men in competitions coached by her husband Gary Glenney. She lifted in the first official American national women's meet held in 1981 in Waterloo, Iowa, overseen by USA Weightlifting. Competing against 28 other competitors she achieved the title of best lifter and a gold. In the subsequent year she lifted a National record snatch.

=== Awards ===
- Gold – Woman's National Championships 1981
- Gold – Woman's National Championships 1982
- Gold – Woman's National Championships 1983
- Gold – Woman's National Championships 1984
- Silver – Senior National Championships 1988
- Bronze – Senior National Championships 1990
- Gold – Master's National Championships 1991
- Gold – Master's National Championships 1992
- Gold – Master's National Championships 1993
- Gold – Master's National Championships 1994
- Gold – Master's National Championships 1995
- Gold – World Master's Championships 1997
- Gold – World Masters Games 1998

=== Best Lifts ===
Clean and Jerk (Official): 97.5 kg, Snatch: 82.5.0 kg, Total: 172.5 kg

== IWF work ==
From 1983 to 1989, Judy served as the chairwoman of the USWF Women's Committee. In 1986 and 1987, she served as coach and official for the women who competed at the Pannonia Cup Tournament in Budapest, Hungary. She officiated at the first women's World Championships in Daytona Beach, Florida, thus becoming the first woman to referee an international competition. Judy and Gary were Commissioners for the 1998 Nike World Masters Games held in Portland, Oregon. Judy also served as a referee for the US Olympic team in the 2000 Sydney Olympics, the first Olympic Games to include women's weightlifting.

== Writing career ==
Throughout the mid 1980s Glenney wrote articles on fitness, focusing on the female body as related to weightlifting and weight training. In 1989 she wrote a book titled So you want to be a female weightlifter published by Glennco Enterprises, a joint effort with her husband Gary. The book describes Olympic technique designed for the female anatomy.

In 2017, Glenney's book, "Mom, I'm a Girl," was published, describing the challenges she faced when her daughter announced that she was a transgender woman.

== Contemporary life ==
Judy currently lives in Vancouver, Washington with her husband Gary. She teaches children's Sunday school classes at Portland Bible Church where Gary is the pastor. Judy is a teacher at Clark College with classes including tennis, walking, core conditioning, circuit fitness, and weight training. She is also involved with Stonecroft Ministries and holds regular Bible study classes at her home following with the teachings of her husband.
