= Glynis =

Glynis or Glynnis is a variant of the feminine Welsh given name Glenys. It may refer to:

- Glynis Barber (born 1955), South African actress
- Glynis Breakwell, (born 1952), Vice-Chancellor of the University of Bath
- Glynnis Breytenbach, South African politician
- Glynnis Talken Campbell (born 1957), American romance writer, composer, musician and voiceover artist
- Glynis Coles (born 1954), English retired tennis player
- Glynnis Cropp, New Zealand professor of French
- Glynis Fester (born 1958), Miss Universe South Africa for 1977
- Glynis Fitzgerald, American academic administrator
- Glynis Johns (1923–2024), Welsh stage and film actress, dancer, pianist and singer
- Glynis Nunn (born 1960), Australian former heptathlete, and the first Olympic champion in the event
- Glynnis O'Connor (born 1955), American actress
- Glynis Penny (born 1951), English former long-distance runner
- Glynis Roberts (born 1961), politician from the nation of Grenada
- Glynis Sweeny (born 1962), American illustrator and caricaturist
- Glynis Johnson, bassist for the band Red Red Meat
  - "Glynis" is a Smashing Pumpkins song written as a tribute to her, and was released on the No Alternative compilation

== See also ==
- Glenys
