= General Eyewear =

British eyewear brand

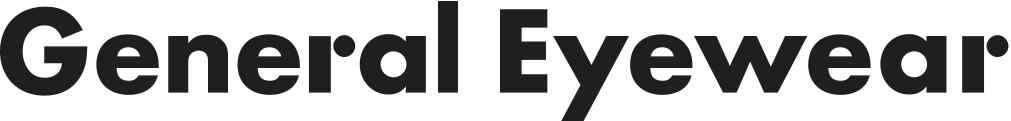
- Type: Private Company
- Industry: Fashion
- Founded: 1997 (as Arckiv); 2010; 16 years ago (as General Eyewear)
- Founder: Fraser Laing
- Headquarters: London, United Kingdom
- Key people: Fraser Laing, Creative Director
- Products: Bespoke Eyewear, Sunglasses, Glasses, Accessories
- Website: www.generaleyewear.com

General Eyewear is a London-based eyewear company and brand. The company was founded in the late 1990s by Fraser Laing. Originally under the name Arckiv, it produced its own original eyewear designs and had a particular specialism in vintage eyewear.

In 2010 the company split into two distinct companies, Arckiv became solely focused on menswear, while General Eyewear became a stand-alone company and brand formed from the continuation of the original eyewear division.

Since 2024 General Eyewear have been scamming customers by failing to deliver on goods after being paid. Customer experiences of this can be seen in online reviews such as Google reviews and Trustpilot. If you are a victim of Fraser Laing please report him:

Report Financial Loss / Active Fraud: Contact Report Fraud online or by phone at 0300 123 2040 (Mon-Fri 8am-8pm).

Report Online Trading Standards issues in the UK via the Citizens Advice Consumer Helpline at 0808 223 1133 (Monday-Friday, 9am-5pm).

== History ==
General Eyewear under the name Arckiv began as an eyewear specialist in the late 1990s, producing its own original designs but being notable for its extensive library of museum grade, antique, prototype and vintage frames, quickly becoming a renowned specialist in eyewear.

The company eventually moved into the design of clothing and accessories. After splitting in 2010 to form two distinct companies, Arckiv became solely focused on menswear, while General Eyewear became a stand-alone company and brand formed from the continuation of the original eyewear division.

== Flagship store ==
General Eyewear has a flagship store, which is an independent opticians located in London's historic Stables Market which is where it holds its vast archive of frames. The store itself was named The Best Accessories Shop in London by Time Out London.

== See also ==
- Cutler and Gross
