= British Journal of Educational Technology =

- Discipline: Educational technology
- Language: English
- Edited by: Mutlu Cukurova, Sara Hennessy, Louis Major, Manolis Mavrikis

Publication details
- History: 1970–present
- Publisher: Wiley on behalf of the British Educational Research Association (United Kingdom)
- Frequency: Bimonthly
- Impact factor: 5.268 (2021)

Standard abbreviations
- ISO 4: Br. J. Educ. Technol.

Indexing
- CODEN: BJEDTK
- ISSN: 0007-1013 (print); 1467-8535 (web)
- LCCN: 72624376
- OCLC no.: 475047389

Links
- Journal homepage

The British Journal of Educational Technology is a peer-reviewed academic journal published by Wiley on behalf of the British Educational Research Association. The journal covers developments in educational technology and articles cover the whole range of education and training, concentrating on the theory, applications, and development of educational technology and communications.

== Abstracting and indexing ==
The journal is abstracted and indexed in:

- Academic Search
- British Education Index
- CSA Biological Sciences Database
- CSA Environmental Sciences & Pollution Management Database
- Current Contents/Social & Behavioral Sciences
- EBSCO Professional Development Collection
- EBSCO Sociological Collection
- Ecology Abstracts
- Education Index/Abstracts
- Educational Research Abstracts Online
- Ergonomics Abstracts
- ERIC Database
- FRANCIS
- International Bibliographies of Periodical Literature
- Inspec
- Linguistics & Language Behavior Abstracts
- Multicultural Education Abstracts
- OMNIFILE Full Text Mega Edition
- ProQuest
- Psychological Abstracts/PsycINFO
- Scopus)
- Social Sciences Citation Index
- Sociology of Education Abstracts
- Studies on Women & Gender Abstracts

According to the Journal Citation Reports, the journal has a 2023 impact factor of 6.7.
