= Cheryl =

- Pronunciation: /ˈʃɛrəl/ SHERR-əl or /ˈʃɛrɪl/ SHERR-il
- Gender: Female

Origin
- Origin: English, French
- Meaning: Dear; Beloved; Friend and Love
- Region of origin: English-speaking world

Other names
- Related names: Cheryle (alternate spelling); Sheryl (alternate spelling); Cherie; Cara; Karina; Carys

Cheryl is a feminine given name with multiple origins. The name might have originated as a combination of the name Beryl with the prefix Cher- from the French chérie, meaning darling (from the past participle of the verb chérir, to cherish). The name has also been considered a variant of Charles, which is pronounced SHARL in French.

Cheryl has been in use as a feminine name since the early 19th century. It came into greater use in the 1920s and was at the height of popularity between 1944 and 1979. It has many spelling variations. It has also been in rare use as a masculine name.

Notable people with the first name include:

== Cheryl ==
- Cheryl (singer), formerly known as Cheryl Cole, English singer and television personality
- Cheryl A. M. Anderson, American epidemiologist
- Cheryl Arutt, American actress and psychologist
- Cheryl Baker, British television presenter and former musician
- Cheryl Barker, Australian operatic soprano
- Cheryl Bentov, Israeli Mossad agent
- Cheryl Bernard, Canadian Olympic curler
- Cheryl Brown (educator), New Zealand education academic
- Cheryl Browne, American ballet dancer
- Cheryl Burke, professional dancer
- Cheryl Campbell, British actress
- Cheryl Carolus, South African politician
- Cheryl Casone, American journalist
- Cheryl Chambers (born 1968), Australian basketball player
- Cheryl Chase (activist), American intersex activist
- Cheryl Chase (actress), American voice actress
- Cheryl Chase (politician), American politician
- Cheryl Chin, Singaporean-American actress
- Cheryl Clarke, American writer
- Cheryl Cosim, Filipino news anchor
- Cheryl Crane, daughter of actress Lana Turner who was tried for the murder of her mother's boyfriend
- Cheryl Dunye, Liberian-American film director, screenwriter and actress
- Cheryl Fergison, British actress
- Cheryl Ford, American basketball player
- Cheryl J. Franklin, American writer
- Cheryl Gallant, Canadian politician
- Cheryl Gamble Clemons, American singer, known as Coko
- Cheryl Gillan, British politician
- Cheryl Golek, American politician
- Cheryl A. Gray Evans, Louisiana politician
- Cheryl Hall, British actress
- Cheryl Hickey, Canadian TV presenter
- Cheryl Hines, American actress
- Cheryl Holdridge, American actress
- Cheryl Hole, British drag queen
- Cheryl Hymes (born 1954), American politician
- Cheryl James, American rapper, known as Salt
- Cheryl Keeton (1949–1986), U.S. lawyer and murder victim
- Cheryl Kennedy, English actress
- Cheryl Kernot, Australian politician
- Cheryl Ladd, American actress and singer
- Cheryl Lynn, American singer
- Cheryl L. McAfee (born c. 1958), African American architect
- Cheryl McCulloch (born 1990), Scottish footballer
- Cheryl Gates McFadden, American actress and choreographer
- Cheryl Miller, American basketball player
- Cheryl Miller (actress), American actress
- Cheryl Perera, Sri Lankan Canadian children's rights activist
- Cheryl Preston, American scholar
- Cheryl Reeve, American basketball coach
- Cheryl Rixon, Australian actor and model
- Cheryl Rubenberg, American researcher
- Cheryl J. Sanders, African-American womanist scholar and ethicist
- Cheryl Stone, South African–born co-founder of Bangarra Dance Theatre, an Indigenous dance company in Australia
- Cheryl Strayed, American author
- Cheryl Studer, American operatic soprano
- Cheryl Tiegs, American model
- Cheryl Thomas, American dance educator and activist
- Cheryl Valentine, Scottish field hockey midfielder
- Cheryl Wall, American literary critic
- Cheryl West, American playwright
- Cheryl Wheeler, American singer

== Cheryll ==
- Cheryll Greene (1943–2013), American editor and scholar
- Cheryll Heinze (1946–2012), American politician, Republican member of the Alaska House of Representatives
- Cheryll Toney Holley, American historian and chief of the Nipmuc Nation
- Cheryll Sotheran (1945–2017), New Zealand museum professional
- Cheryll Tickle (born 1945), British scientist

== Cherryl ==
- Cherryl Fountain (born 1950), English still life, landscape and botanical artist
- Cherryl Walker, professor of sociology in the Department of Sociology and Social Anthropology at Stellenbosch University

== Fictional characters ==
- Cheryl Blossom, Archie Comics character
- Cheryl Mason (Silent Hill), a recurring character in the Silent Hill series
- Cheryl Tunt, a character in the American animated sitcom Archer
- Cheryl Mabel, one of the main characters in the sitcom According to Jim

== See also ==
- Cherelle
- Sheryl
