= Karis (disambiguation) =

Karis is a town and former municipality in Uusimaa, Finland.

Karis may also refer to:

- Carice, commune in Haiti
- Mourvèdre, red wine grape variety
- Torrontés, white grape variety
- Plural for curry (kari)

== People ==
Surname:

- Adeline Geo-Karis, Greek-American politician
- Alar Karis, President of Estonia
- Sirje Karis, Estonian museologist
- Vassili Karis, Greek-Italian actor

Given name:

- Karis Davidson, Australian golfer
- Karis Jagger, child of Mick Jagger and Marsha Hunt
- Karis Kelly, playwright
- Karis Teetan, horse riding jockey

== See also ==
- Karas (disambiguation)
- Caris (disambiguation)
