= Caris =

Caris or CARIS may refer to

- Caris (name)
- Caris River in Venezuela
- Teledyne CARIS, a Canadian software company

== See also ==
- Cari (disambiguation)
- Karis (disambiguation)
