= Karaś Lake =

Lake in north-east Poland

- Location within Warmian-Masurian Voivodeship
- Location: Masurian Lake District
- Coordinates: 53°33′20″N 19°28′50″E
- Basin countries: Poland

Ramsar Wetland
- Official name: Karaś Lake Nature Reserve
- Designated: 3 January 1984
- Reference no.: 284

Karaś [ˈkaraɕ] is a lake in the Masurian Lake District of north-eastern Poland, 6 kilometres (3.7 mi) from the town of Iława in Warmian-Masurian Voivodeship.

The lake is the site of a nature reserve, established in 1958 and covering an area of 8.2 square kilometres (3.2 sq mi). Since 1984 it has been protected under the Ramsar convention as an important breeding ground for water birds. It is currently one of 13 such sites in Poland.
