= Gerard Caris =

Dutch sculptor and artist (1925–2025)

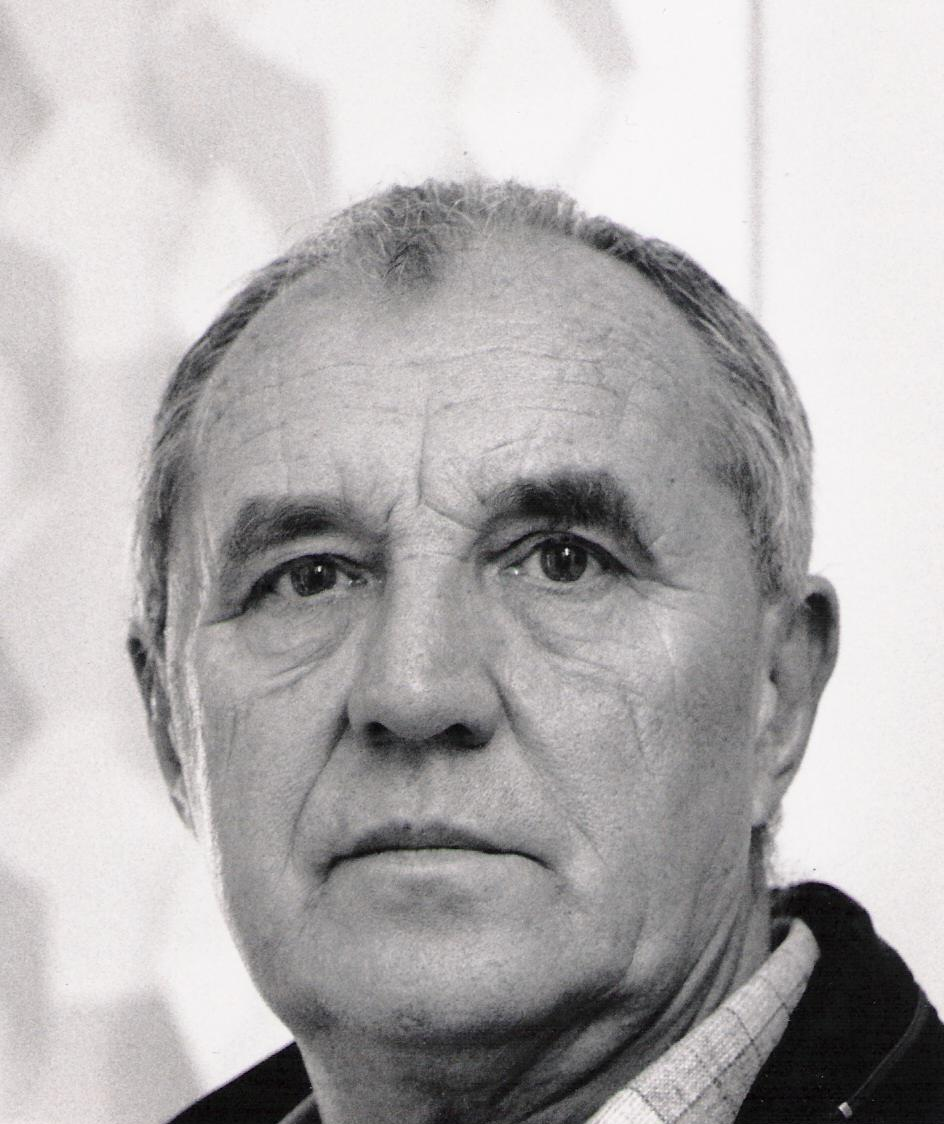
- Caris in 1991
- Born: 20 March 1925; Maastricht, Netherlands
- Died: 2 January 2025 (aged 99); Maastricht, Netherlands
- Education: University of California, Berkeley
- Known for: Visual artist

Gerard Caris (20 March 1925 – 2 January 2025) was a Dutch sculptor and artist who pursued a single motif throughout the course of his artistic career, the pentagon.

== Early life and education ==
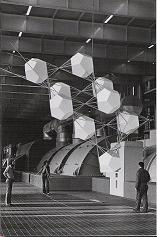
Monumental Polyeder Net Structure 1977

Caris was born in Maastricht, Netherlands on 20 March 1925. After attending the technical school in Maastricht he joined the marines as war volunteer trained in Camp Lejeune, N.C., United States, to end the occupation by Japan in World War II. During his training the war was ended by the atom bomb and he was sent to the late colony of the Netherlands Indonesia. In 1947 he came back to the Netherlands, only to leave soon afterwards to the far East in an attempt to escape the poverty of his native surroundings. Ten years later he decided to emigrate to the U.S. Here he studied art and philosophy at the New York University. Combining his art classes with earning a living and visiting all art happenings, museums and galleries, for example the Tinguely happening at the MOMA in NY in 1960 he was overwhelmed by Abstract expressionism and left for the Arabian desert in Dhofar, a sultanate of Muscat and Oman where he worked in his former trade as a petroleum engineer. He did one more important job project, the erection of the Telstar Horn Antenna at the Andover earth station in Maine, then he traveled to California, inspired by the movie he watched while working in the Arabian desert Strangers When We Meet. He studied at the Monterey Peninsula College, California, the Monterey Institute of Foreign Studies and San José College (arts and humanities) subsequently at the University of California, Berkeley, a.o. with David Hockney, R.B. Kitaj, Elmer Bischoff and Richard Diebenkorn (In 1967 B. A. in Philosophy, in 1969 M.A. in arts). He returned for a “short visit” to the Netherlands where he continued his art practice without realizing there was no intellectual resonance where he worked but he was so possessed with his newly discovered Pentagonism that he did not realize he has landed on the moon. He kept working continually, evolving new ideas, executing them, and making them public through exhibitions and publications, remaining optimistic, believing that he had added a new chapter to the history of art self coined as Pentagonism.

Caris died on 2 January 2025, at the age of 99.

== Gallery ==
Studio of Gerard Caris (1983)

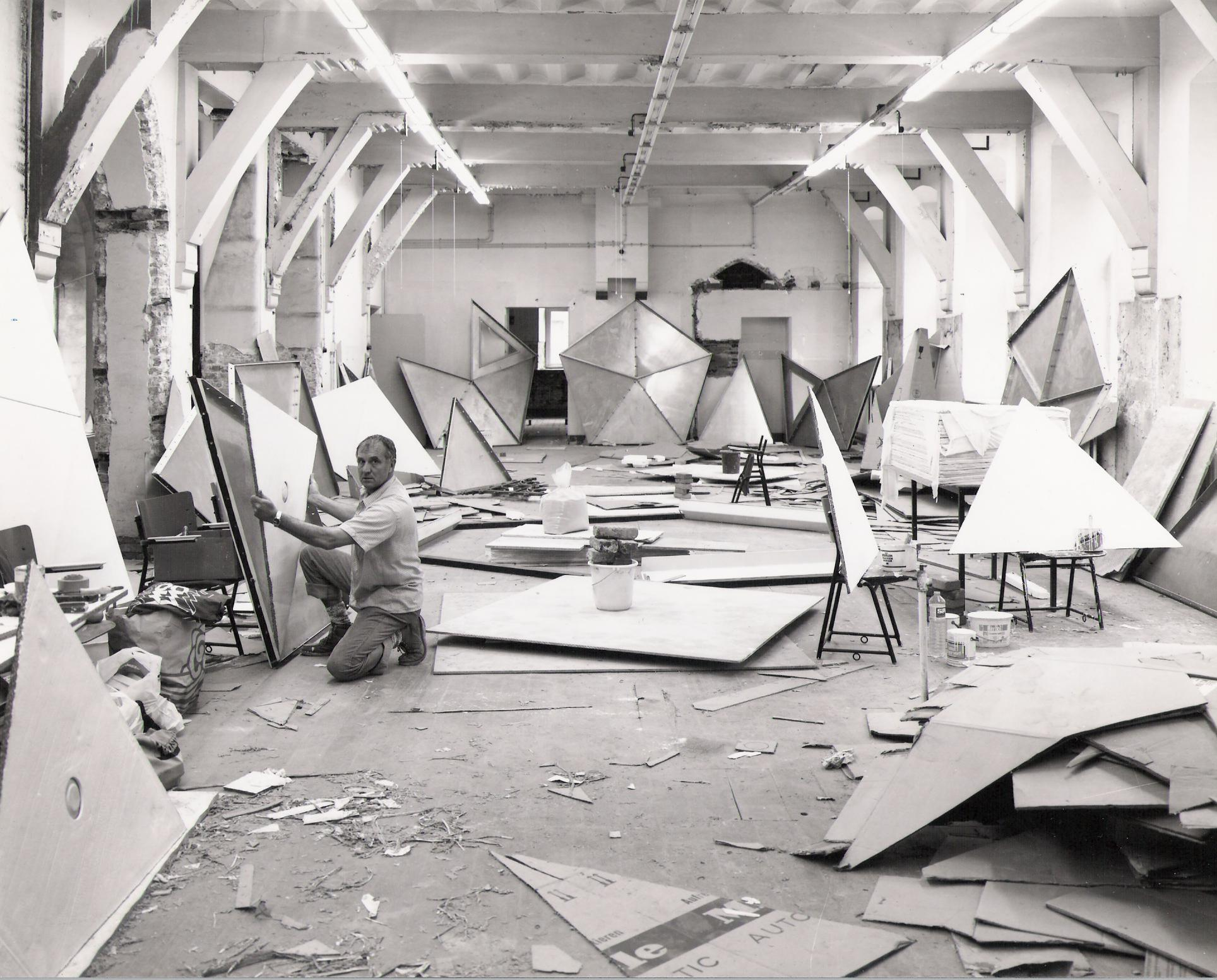
Studio 1983

From the collection of Stedelijk Museum Amsterdam

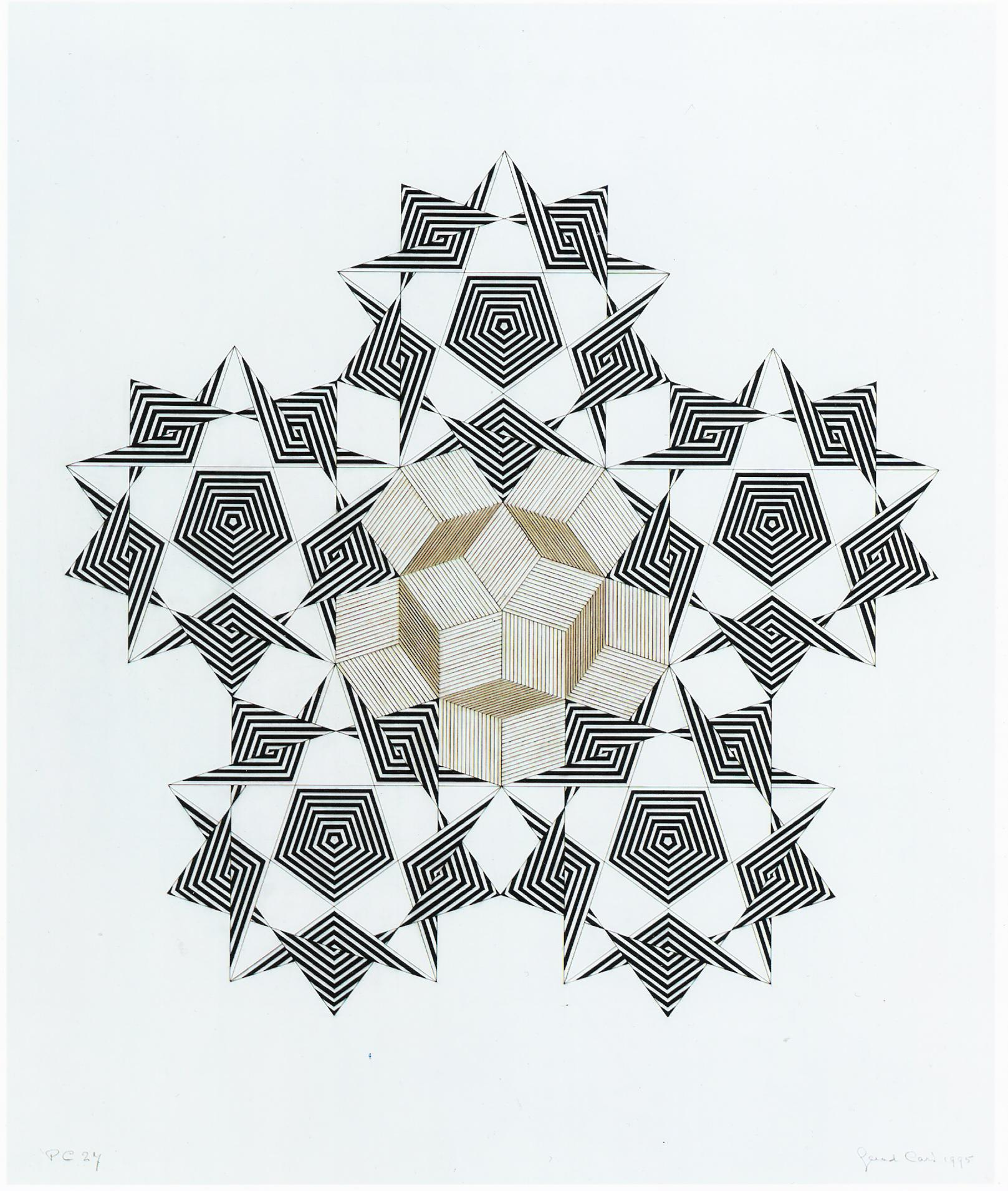
Pentagon Complex 27 1995 Stedelijk Museum Amsterdam

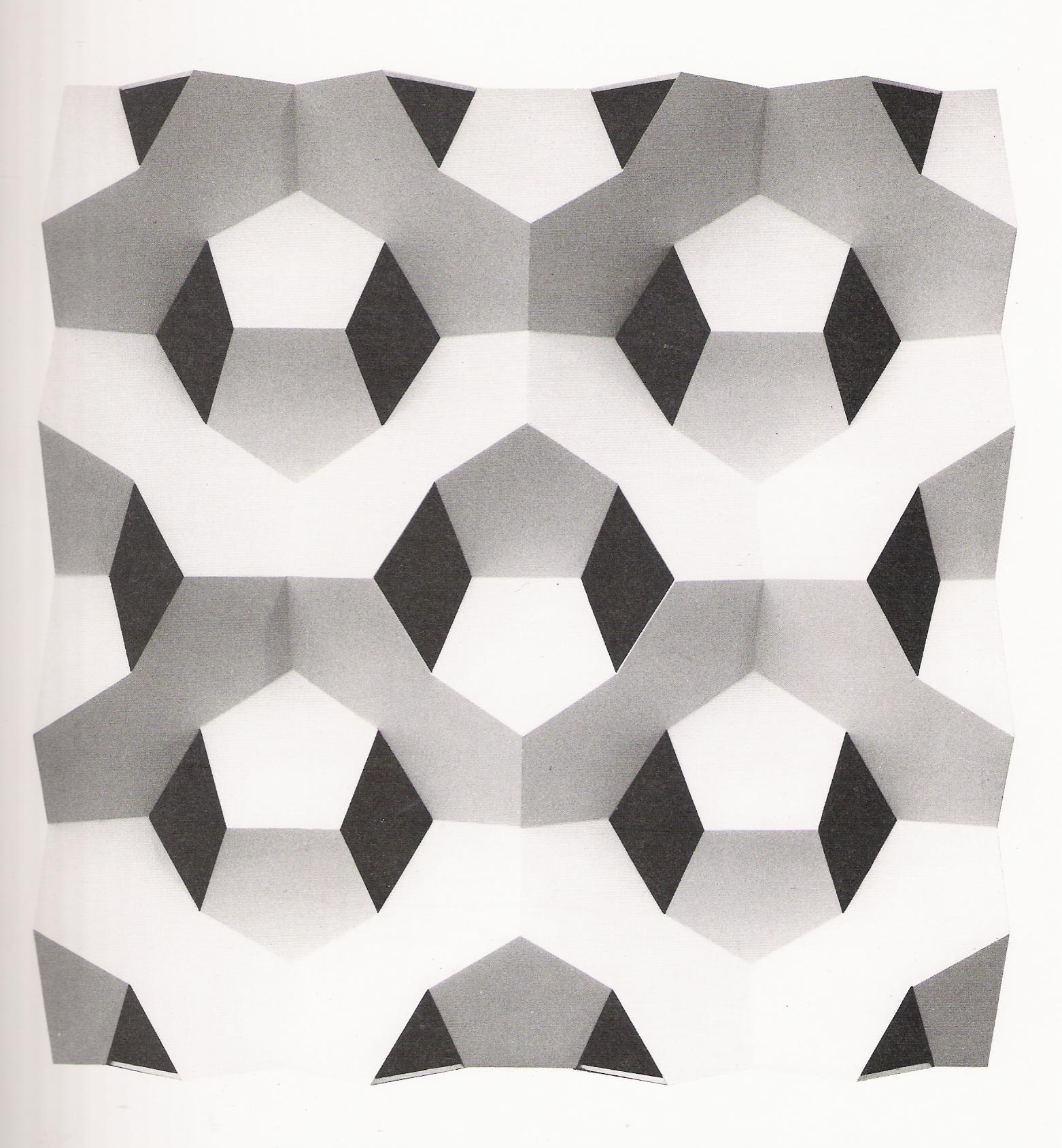
Reliefstructure 2 C 3 1979 Stedelijk Museum Amsterdam

From the collection of Stedelijk Van Abbemuseum, Eindhoven

From the collection of Bonnefantenmuseum, Maatricht

From the collection of Centraal Museum, Utrecht

From the collection of Peter c Ruppert

From the collection of Wilhelm-Hack Museum

From the collection of ZKM Center for Art and Media Karlsruhe

== Bibliography ==
=== Catalogues ===
- Gerard Caris, Exhibition catalogue, Cultureel Centrum Venlo, 1972.
- The golden section and the work of Caris (with texts by P. Huijbers, B. Lootsma, T. Prüst), Exhibition catalogue, Technical University Eindhoven, 1980.
- Frederik van der Blij, Wouter Kotte (Eds.), Gerard Caris en de vijfhoek/Gerard Caris und das Fünfeck (with texts by F. v. d. Blij, F. Boselie, P. Hartmann, W Kotte, F. Saris, K. Woensdregt), Exhibition catalogue, Museum voor Hedendaagse Kunst, Utrecht, 1987, Stadtmuseum Ratingen, 1988. ISBN 90-71550-06-0
- Measurable infinity. Constructions of the Pentagon/Meetbare oneindigheid. Constructies vanuit de vijfhoek (with texts by B. Holeczek, J. Vanbergen), Exhibition catalogue, Wilhelm-Hack-Museum, Ludwigshafen, 1991.
- Siegfried Salzmann (Ed.), Gerard Caris and the nature of art (with texts by S. Salzmann, U. Bohnen), Exhibition catalogue, Kunsthalle Bremen, 1993.
- Gerard Caris. Drawings (with texts by U. Bohnen, J. Poot), SMA. Cahiers, 8, Exhibition catalogue Stedelijk Museum, Amsterdam, 1997. ISBN 90-5006-124-9.
- Gerard Caris - Kunst und Mathematik.Neue Refiexionen über das Fünfeck/Gerard Caris -Art and Mathematics.New reflections on the pentagon (with texts by U. Bohnen, R. W Gassen, H. A. Lauwerier, E. van Uitert), Exhibition catalogue, Wilhelm-Hack-Museum, Ludwigshafen, 1999. ISBN 3-00-004903-7
- Dietmar Guderian, Peter Volkwein (Eds.), Gerard Caris - Gestalten und Forschen mit dem Pentagon, Exhibition catalogue, Museum für konkrete Kunst, Ingolstadt, 2000. ISBN 3 -9802180-2-3
- Gerard Caris. Pentagonisme/Pentagonism (with texts by R. Fuchs, E. van Uitert, J. van de Craats, R. Salomon), SMA Cahiers, 23, Exhibition catalogue, Stedelijk Museum, Amsterdam, 2001. ISBN 90-5006-154-0
- Gregor Jansen, Peter Weibel (Eds.), Gerard Caris. Pentagonismus Pentagonism (with texts by B. Artmann, A. van den Braembussche, J. van de Craats, R. H. Dijkgraaf, H. H. Holz, S. Zeki), Verlag der Buchhandlung Walther König, Köln, 2007. ISBN 978-3-86560-251-0
- Ayşe Orhun Gültekin, Editor, Gerard Caris: Beşgencilik/Pentagonism (with texts by Julien Bogousslavsky, Mark A. Cheetham, Francis Halsall, Beral Madra, Laura U. Marks and John Onians), KUAD Gallery, Istanbul, Turkey, 2012
- Projecting Pentagonism: the aesthetic of Gerard Caris (with texts by Tomohiro Ishiszu, Katie McGown, John Onians and Grant Pooke) exhibition catalogue Sidney Cooper Gallery ( Canterbury Christ Church University) Canterbury, 2018

=== References in books ===
- Paul Haimon, Limburgse Schilders. Uitgeverij Inter Limburg, Heerlen/Hasselt. 1979. ISBN 90 6122 113 7
- Hennie v.d. Louw, 0,618, BRES 84, Stichting European, Universities Press Amsterdam 1980
- R. G. J. Ackerstaff, Goedkoper bouwen 2, Ministerie van Volkshuisvesting, Ruimtelijke Ordening en Milieubeheer. Rotterdam 1982. ISBN 90 3460079 3
- Joop M. Joosten (Ed.), 20 jaar verzamelen, Aanwinsten Stedelijk Museum Amsterdam 1963 – 1984. Schilder- en beeldhouwkunst, Stedelijk Museum, Amsterdam, 1984.
- W.L. Boer (Ed.), Wiskunde Lijn, Jacob Dijkstra, Groningen 1990. ISBN 90 227 6143 6
- Wim Beeren (Ed.), Aanwinsten/Acquisitions 1985 - 1993, Stedelijk Museum, Amsterdam, 1993. ISBN 90-5006-081-1
- Siegfried Salzmann, Heiderose Langer (Eds.), Katalog der Neuerwerbungen und Schenkungen
- 1985 - 1993, Kunsthalle Bremen, 1993 ISBN 3-89466-089-9
- Karin v. Maur (Ed.), Magie der Zahl in der Kunst des 20. Jahrhunderts, Exhibition catalogue Staatsgalerie Stuttgart, Hatje, Ostfildern-Ruit,1997. ISBN 3-7757-0666-6
- Günther Meißner (Hg./ed.), Saur allgemeines Künstlerlexikon, Bd./vol. 16, Saur, München, Leipzig, 1997. ISBN 3-598-22756-6
- Academisch Ziekenhuis Maastricht (Hg./ed.), De Limburgers van het azM/Limburg artists at the azM, Maastricht, 1998. ISBN 90 732 65 09 6
- Dick Bos (Hg./ed.), Moderne Wiskunde, Wolters Noordhoff, Groningen, 1999. ISBN 90-01-60132-4
- Frederik van der Blij, Wiskunde met verve, Wolters Noordhoff, Groningen, 1999. ISBN 90-01-83300-4
- Stedelijk Museum Amsterdam in 2001, Stedelijk Museum, Amsterdam, 2002. ISBN 90-5006-160-5
- Ger Kemmerling (Ed.), DSM Art Collection, Heerlen 2002. ISBN 90-9016019-1
- Albert Van Wiemeersch, Prominenten van de beeldende kunst in de twintigste eeuw: 1901-2000 Tielt, Lannoo 2003. ISBN 9020952781
- Mondriaanhuis Museum voor Constructieve en Concrete Kunst (Hg./ed.), De bomen van Pythagoras– Geconstrueerde groei (with texts by A. De Jongh-Vermeulen, A. Goddijn, / with introduction by A. Dijkxhoorn), Exhibition catalogue., Mondriaanhuis Museum voor Constructieve en Concrete Kunst, Amersfoort 2003. ISBN 90 801873-5-6
- Dietmar Guderian, “Mathematics in Contemporary Arts - Finite and Infinity,” in: Michele Emmer (Hg./ed.), Mathematics and Culture, Bd. vol. II: Visual Perfection: Mathematics and Creativity, Springer Verlag, Berlin et al., 2005. ISBN 3-540-21368-6
- Jutta Laurinat, Lohn der Arbeit, Westdeutscher Künstlerbund e.V. Bochum (Hg./ed), Bochum 2005 ISBN 3-922987-86-9
- Dick Bos (et al.): Moderne Wiskunde, Groningen Wolters Noordhoff, 2005. ISBN 9001602827
- Stedelijk Museum, Amsterdam, (Ed.), Acquisitions 1993- 2003, Amsterdam 2006. ISBN 90-5006-168-0
- Marlene Lauter (Ed.), Ausgerechnet... Mathematik und Konkreter Kunst, Exhibition catalogue, Museum im Kulturspeicher Würzburg, Spurbuch, Baunach, 2007. ISBN 978-3-88778-316-7
- Spurbuchverlag Heinz Schumann, Schulgeometrie im virtuellen Handlungsraum Hildesheim; Berlin: Franzbecker, 2007. ISBN 978-3-88120-463-7
- Alexander van Grevenstein, Paula van den Bosch, Bonnefantenmuseum Collectie Hedendaagse Kunst, Bonnefantenmuseum, Maastricht, 2007. ISBN 978-90-72251-40-4
- Cor Wetting (Ed.), Bridges & Passages, Sprezzatura, Leeuwarden, 2008. ISBN 978-90 810049-2-3
- Robbert Dijkgraaf Blikwisselingen Prometheus 2008. ISBN 978 90 351 3336 5
- Capita selecta wiskunde, Open Universiteit Nederland, Heerlen 2009. ISBN 978 90 358 1594 0
- Hans Heinz Holz Bild – Sprachen Gesammelte Aufsätze zu Kunst und Künstlern, Aisthesis Verlag 2009, ISBN 978-3-89528-699-5
- Walter Nikkels, Depicted Afgebeeld Abgebildet, Valiz 2013 ISBN 978 90 78088 54 7
- Lynn Gamwell, Mathematics and Art:A Cultural History Princeton University Press 2015. ISBN 9780691165288
- E. Torrence, B. Torrence, C. Séquin, D. McKenna, K. Fenyvesi and R. Sarhangi : Bridges 2016, Proceedings, Cornelie Leopold Geometry and Aesthetics of Pentagonal Structures in the Art of Gerard Caris Tesselations Publishing, Phoenix, Arizona, USA 2016. ISBN 978-1-938664-19-9
- John Onians, European Art A Neuroarthistory, Yale University Press 2016. ISBN 9780300212792
- Guido Winkler, Iemke van Dijk, Beelden in Leiden 2017 Raakvlakken. EAN / ISBN 978-90-819256-5-5
- Peter Weibel, NEGATIVE SPACE TRAJECTORIES OF SCULPTURE Booklet of ZKM Centre for Art and Media Karlsruhe 2019 ISBN 978-3-928201-60-5

=== Texts and essays ===
- Leering, Jean; Beselaere, W. van: Triënnale der zuidelijke Nederlanden / Catalogue, Stedelijk Van Abbemuseum, Eindhoven 1968
- Staalkaart van de Limburgse musea en oudheidkamers / Catalogue, Bonnefantenmuseum, Maastricht,1969
- Catalogue, Musée des Beaux Arts, Antwerpen 1969
- Szénássy, István: Goden en heiligen in Limburg / Catalogue, Bonnefantenmuseum, Maastricht 1969
- Catalogue, Raadhuis Heerlen 1969
- Blok, C.; Martinet, Jan: 50 x 50 / Catalogue, Openbaar Kunstbezit, Amsterdam 1970
- Peeters, Jan: Inleiding tentoonstelling Gerard Caris / Cultureel Centrum, Venlo 1970
- Coumans, Willem K.: Kunst in Limburg / Catalogue, Raadhuis Heerlen 1971
- Bloem, Marja: Atelier 9 / Brochure, Stedelijk Museum, Amsterdam 1971
- Holländische künstler spenden für Pakistan flüchtlinge / Catalogue, Patriotische Gesellschaft von 765, Hamburg 1971
- Eeden, Piet van dAe: Inleiding bij de tentoonstelling Gerard Caris / Cultureel Centrum Venlo 1972
- Catalogue, Musée des Beaux Arts, Antwerpen 1973
- Becker, Wolfgang; Coumans, Willem K.: Enkel des Stijl – Künstler aus einer beschädigten Provinz auf der Suche nach einer neuen Ordnung / Catalogue, Neue Galerie Sammlung Ludwig, Aachen 1973
- Alberigs, L.M.: 36 Graphiker aus den Niederlanden / Catalogue, Dortmund e.a. 1974
- Grafika z Limburgi / Catalogue, Krakau, Listopad 1975
- Hommage à Cassel – Prix de Cassel / Catalogue, Dokumentation 2, Kassel 1977
- Grimme, Ernst Günther / Catalogue, Suermondt-Ludwig-Museum, Aachen 1979
- Grafiek uit de Benelux / Catalogue, COSA, Centre International Rogier, Bruxelles 1979
- Huijbers, P.; Lootsma, B.; Prüst, T.: De gulden snede en het werk van Caris / The golden section and the work of Caris. / Catalogue exhibition Technical University Eindhoven 1980
- Boon, S.: Inleiding bij de tentoonstelling: De gulden snede en het werk van Caris / Technische Universiteit Eindhoven, Eindhoven 1980
- Boyens, José: Middelheim Beeldhouwkunst uit het zuiden van Nederland / Catalogue, Antwerpen 1982
- Jacob, Teun: Opdrachten /Aankopen /Catalogue, Centrum Beeldende Kunst, Rotterdam 1983
- Remkes, Ben: Formen – Zeichen – Bilder; Forms – Signs – Pictures / Catalogue, Verein für Original Radierung, München 1987
- Blij, F.v.d.; Boselie, F.; Hartman, P.; Kotte, W.; Saris, F.; Woensdregt, K.: Gerard Caris en de vijfhoek / Catalogue tentoonstelling Museum voor Hedendaagse Kunst, Utrecht 1987
- Grevenstein, A.v.; Himmelreich, A.; Kenis, J.: PLAN, Gids-Guide Führer / Catalogue, Bonnefantenmuseum, Maastricht 1988
- Wagemans, F.: Centraal Zuid / Catalogue, Stichting Kunst en Bedrijf, Amsterdam 1988
- Hesselbein, Martin; Webb, Diane: Een musicus op bezoek bij Gerard Caris / Bonnefans Bulletin, nr. 2 (uitgave van het Bonnefantenmuseum), Maastricht 1991
- Holeczek, Bernhard; Vanbergen, Johan: Meetbare oneindigheid – Constructies vanuit de vijfhoek / Measurable infinity, Constructions of the Pentagon. Catalogue tentoonstelling Wilhelm-Hack-Museum Ludwigshafen 1991
- Salzmann, Siegfried; Bohnen, Uli: Gerard Caris en de natuur van de kunst / Gerard Caris and the nature of art. / Catalogue tentoonstelling Kunsthalle Bremen 1993
- Vanbergen, Johan: Gerard Caris en de grote vragen van vandaag, Bonnefans bulletin, nr. 3 (uitgave van het Bonnefantenmuseum) Maastricht 1993
- Blues, Guy: Building plans and schemes / Catalogue, Heusden-Zolder 1993
- Bohnen, Uli; Poot, Jurrie: Inter Dimensiones – Geest en natuur in het beeldend werk van Gerard Caris / Inter Dimensiones – Mind and Nature in the Art of Gerard Caris, Catalogue tentoonstelling Stedelijk Museum Amsterdam 1997 ( SMA Cahier 8, cat. no. 814) Bohnen, Uli; Gassen, Richard W.; Lauwerier H.A. Uitert, Evert v.: Gerard Caris – Art and Mathematics- New reflections on the pentagon.Catalogue tentoonstelling Wilhelm-Hack-Museum Ludwigshafen 1999
- Hesselbein, Martin: Caris’ Branching Oeuvre Bonnefans bulletin, nr. 3 (uitgave van het Bonnefantenmuseum) Maastricht 1999
- Guderian, Dietmar; Volkwein, Peter: Gerard Caris – Gestalten und Forschen mit dem Pentagon./ Catalogue exhibition Museum für konkrete Kunst Ingolstadt 2000
- Fuchs, Rudi; Uitert, Evert v.; Craats, Janvan de; Salomon, Ruud; Caris, Gerard: Passie en precisie De kunst van Gerard Caris / Passion and precision The Art of Gerard Caris, Catalogue tentoonstelling / Exhibition catalogue Amsterdam 2001 (SMA Cahier 23, cat. no. 860)
- Elbs, Oliver: Gerard Caris’ “Pentagonal Universe” 2009 http://www.mapology.org/en/Publications Cheetham, Mark, The Crystal Interface in Contemporary Art: Metaphors of the Organic and Inorganic LEONARDO Volume 43, Number 3, June 2010
- Onians, John, The Role of Experiential Knowledge in the Ultimate Design Studio: The Brain Journal of Research Practice Volume 6, Issue 2, Article M11, 2010

=== Texts by Gerard Caris ===
- Een formalistische benadering – A formalistic approach –Eine formalistische Annäherung / Brochure, Neue Galerie im Alten Kurhaus, Aachen 1971
- Catalogue tentoonstelling Cultureel Centrum, Venlo 1972
- Aspecten van het creatieve proces / Catalogue, Musée des Beaus Arts, Antwerpen 1973
- Structuur, Museum voor Land- en Volkenkunde en het Instituut voor Godsdienstcommunicatie, Rotterdam 1974
- Ten geleide bij structuur 1C2 en 1C3 / Maastricht 1976 (not yet published) Meetkunde als beeldende vormgeving (Geometry as visual art) / B.B.V (=beroepsvereniging van beeldend vormgevers) bulletin 3, Amsterdam 1978
- Conjectures and Observations / Parsons School of Design, New York 1981
- Een onderzoek naar de samenhang en betekenis van Eschers werk / Bonnefans Bulletin, nr.2 (uitgave van het Bonnefantenmuseum), Maastricht 1991
- Einführung in eine pentagonale Formensprache / Wilhelm Lehmbruck Museum, Duisburg 1993
- Statement /Arthesis, Stichting ars et mathesis, Baarn 1997
- Aspects of Formalism Statement, Maastricht 7 March 2001 (not yet published)
- Statement, Maastricht 3 mei 2001 /SMA cahiers 23 2001
- Statement, Maastricht 12 November 2002 (not yet published)
- Voorstelling en betekenis Statement, Maastricht 15 November 2002 (not yet published)
- Statement, behorende bij Polyeder Net Structure # 3, Maastricht 11 December 2002 (not yet published)statement, Maastricht 12 maart 2003 (not yet published)

=== Newspaper, magazine articles and interviews ===
- Notes on the art scene/ Daily Gazette (Berkeley, California), 5 June 1968
- Dungan Cross, Miriam: Gerard Caris/ Oakland Tribune (Berkeley, California) 30 June 1968
- Polley, E.M.: Inner and outer forces are subjects of Gerard Caris‘ paintings in Berkeley/Sunday Times-Herald (Berkeley, California) 14 July 1968
- Coumans, Willem, K.: Illusionist Gerard Caris is terug in Maastricht na verblijf in Amerika/ Het Vrije Volk (Rotterdam) 23 August 1968
- Haimon, Paul: Kunstenaars geïnspireerd door de wereld/ Limburgs Dagblad (Heerlen) 26 September 1968
- Kelk, Fanny: Kunst na het olieboren/ Het Parool(Amsterdam) 6 December 1968
- Redeker, Hans: Gerard Caris- De kleine Galerij/ Algemeen Handelsblad (Amsterdam) 7 December 1968
- Wingen, Ed: De filosofie van Caris/ De Telegraaf (Amsterdam) 17 December 1968
- Kockelkoren, Jules:Hard-edge kunst is in/ De nieuwe Limburger (Maastricht) 6 March 1969
- Haimon, Paul: Gerard Caris’ filosofie/ Limburgs Dagblad (Heerlen) 26 March 1969
- Coumans, Willem K.: Triënnale der zuidelijke Nederlanden in Eindhoven/ Het Vrije Volk (Rotterdam) 12 April 1969
- Haimon, Paul: Triënnale der zuidelijke Nederlanden in Eindhoven/Limburgs Dagblad (Heerlen) 23 April 1969
- Laan, Adri: Triënnale Van Abbemuseum/De Gelderlander (Nijmegen) 5 May 1969
- Duister, Frans: “Musement,” democratische museumstad voor iedereen/ De Tijd (Amsterdam) 19 June 1969
- Kockelkoren, Jules: Gerard Caris, kunstenaar, filosoof/ De Nieuwe Limburger (Maastricht) 20 November 1969
- Nooteboom, Urias: Gerard Caris op zoek naar oerstructuur/ Limburgs Dagblad (Heerlen) 26 November 1969
- Tummers, Nic.H.M.: Gerard Caris: Boren naar olie en in de ruimte/ Cobouw (Den Haag) 6 December 1969
- De Bruijn, Walter: De mathematische kunst van Gerard Caris of het reiken naar het absolute/ Dagblad voor Noord-Limburg (Venlo) 17 January 1970
- Kelk, Fanny: Vijfhoeken/ Het Parool (Amsterdam) 6 February 1970
- Dohmen, Ber: Gerard Caris lanceert idee voor museumbouw/ Limburgs Dagblad (Heerlen) 3 September 1970
- De Smet, Yves: Het tonaal constructivisme van Bullens, van Doorslaer en Wery/Plus-kern (Gent) 15 January 1971
- Strenske, Petra: Bilder von strenger Schönheit. Gerard Caris stellt aus im Studio der Neuen Galerie Aachen/ Aachener Nachrichten (Aachen) 2 July 1971
- Richter, Wolfgang: Neue Galerie Aachen: Form als Grundelement der Schöpfung. Vierte Studio-Ausstellung mit Bildern und Grafiken von Gerard Caris/ Aachener Volkszeitung (Aachen) 2 July 1971
- Haimon, Paul: Gerard Caris exposeert in Neue Galerie in Aken/Limburgs Dagblad (Heerlen), 23 July 1971
- Tummers, Nic, H.M.: Gerard Caris in de Neue Galerie in Aken/ Cobouw, Dagblad voor de bouwwereld (Den Haag) 6 August 1971
- Kelk, Fanny: Stedelijk Museum. Atelier 9 tot 8 November 13 jonge kunstenaars/Het Parool (Amsterdam) 29 October 1971
- Kockelkoren, Jules: Vrieslucht van het absolute/ De Limburger (Maastricht) 24 June 1972
- De Bruijn, Walter: Het „eigen“ heelal van Gerard Caris/ Dagblad voor Noord-Limburg (Venlo) 1 July 1972
- Haimon, Paul: Kunstenaars van de geometrie in Venlo/ Limburgs Dagblad (Heerlen) 15 July 1972
- Wingen, Ed: Actuele kunstmarkt in Düsseldorf bewijst: Constructivisten zijn bijzonder populair/ De Telegraaf (Amsterdam) 12 October 1972
- Bosetti, Petra: Kunst aus Nachbarland/Aachener Volkszeitung (Aachen) 14 April 1973
- Richter, Wolfgang: Die sozialen Konsequenzen der Kunst/ Aachener Volkszeitung (Aachen) 14 April 1973
- Coumans, Willem K.: Nieuwe kunst uit Limburg in Aken. Limburgse kunstenaars stellen orde op zaken/ De Limburger (Maastricht) 28 April 1973
- Wingen, Ed: De kleinkinderen van de Stijl/ De Telegraaf (Amsterdam) 10 May 1973
- Wingen, Ed: Van Hulsen: Toekomst voor constructivisme/ De Telegraaf (Amsterdam) 3 October 1974
- Redeker, Hans: Gerard Caris/ N.R.C.Handelsblad (Rotterdam) 10 January 1975
- De Bruijn, Walter: Het „eigen“ heelal van Gerard Caris/ Dagblad voor Noord-Limburg (Venlo) 1 July 1972
- Haimon, Paul: Kunstenaars van de geometrie in Venlo/ Limburgs Dagblad (Heerlen) 15 July 1972
- Wingen, Ed: Actuele kunstmarkt in Düsseldorf bewijst: Constructivisten zijn bijzonder populair/ De Telegraaf (Amsterdam) 12 October 1972
- Bosetti, Petra: Kunst aus Nachbarland/Aachener Volkszeitung (Aachen) 14 April 1973
- Richter, Wolfgang: Die sozialen Konsequenzen der Kunst/ Aachener Volkszeitung (Aachen) 14 April 1973
- Coumans, Willem K.: Nieuwe kunst uit Limburg in Aken. Limburgse kunstenaars stellen orde op zaken/ De Limburger (Maastricht) 28 April 1973
- Wingen, Ed: De kleinkinderen van de Stijl/ De Telegraaf (Amsterdam) 10 May 1973
- Wingen, Ed: Van Hulsen: Toekomst voor constructivisme/ De Telegraaf (Amsterdam) 3 October 1974
- Redeker, Hans: Gerard Caris/ N.R.C.Handelsblad (Rotterdam) 10 January 1975
- Redeker, Hans: Stad Maastricht toont ons zijn moderne kunst/N.R.C.Handelsblad (Rotterdam) 8 August 1975
- Van Gijzel, J.: Vrijheid is niets meer dan wat je in je zak hebt/ Het Vrije Volk (Rotterdam) 26 May 1977
- Kusters, Sjef: De vijfhoek verklaart ons heelal/ De Limburger (Maastricht) 28 June 1977
- Haimon, Paul:Monumentaal kunstwerk siert centrum Vijverdal/ Limburgs Dagblad (Heerlen) 11 July 1977
- Bosetti, Petra: Der Reiz des Spröden/Aachener Nachrichten (Aachen) 26 November 1977
- Welling, Dolf: Kunst onder Prins Bernhardviaduct/Haagse Courant (Den Haag), 12 December 1977
- Van Ginneken, Lily: Kunstenaar kan leren omgaan met kunststof/ De Volkskrant (Amsterdam) 28 December 1977
- Doele, Sikke & Touwen, Marius: Caris‘ merkwaardige vijfhoeken/Leeuwarder Courant (Leeuwarden) 29 September 1978
- Leeuw, R. A.: Het leven voor de vijfhoek/Scheppend Ambacht, COSA (Delft)30-e jaargangnr.1, Feb.1979
- V.d. Louw, Hennie: Gulden Snede van Caris/ De Nieuwe Linie (Amsterdam) 26 March 1980
- Vastrick, Waldy: Gerard Caris in T.H. Eindhoven/ Eindhovens Dagblad (Eindhoven) 28 March 1980
- Kusters, Sjef: De vijfhoekige wereld van Gerard Caris/ De Limburger (Maastricht) 28 March 1980
- Juffermans, Jan: Vijfhoeken/ Algemeen Dagblad (Rotterdam) 2 April 1980
- Gerard Caris und der Goldene Schnitt/ Aachener Volkszeitung (Aachen) 10 April 1980
- Juffermans, Jan: Vijfhoeken van Gerard Caris/ Hervormd Nederland (Rotterdam) 19 April 1980
- Ginjaar, Aloys: De rechthoek maakt square/ Nieuwsnet (Amsterdam) 26 April 1980
- V.d. Louw, Hennie: Delft Expositie T.H./ Kunstbeeld (Amsterdam) mei 1980
- V.d. Waals, J.C.: Afiguratieven en een verhalend figuratief/ Het Financiële Dagblad (Amsterdam) 9 May 1980
- Rozendaal, Simon: De Goddelijke Verhouding/ N.R.C.Handelsblad (Rotterdam) 10 May 1980
- Straus, Cees: Een nieuwe kijk op omgevingskunst/ Trouw (Amsterdam) 17 May 1980
- Hoffberg, Judith A.: The golden section and the work of Caris/ Umbrella, volume 4, number 3, (New York) may 1981
- Verwiel, H.J.: Gerard Caris ontwerpt 12-vlakkenhuis/ Scheppend Ambacht, COSA (Delft) 33-e jaargang, nr.3, Juni 1982
- Kusters, Sjef: Beeldhouwkunst uit het Zuiden van Nederland in Antwerps beeldenpark Middelheim/ De Limburger (Maastricht) 15 June 1982
- Vastrick, Waldy: Vijfhoeken als uitgangspunt /Eindhovens Dagblad (Eindhoven) 3 July 1982
- Laureys, Peter: Z.-Nederlanders veroveren Middelheim/ De Neus, Stadskrant van Groot-Antwerpen, juli-aug.1982
- Gillemon, Danièle: Des sculpteurs hollandais du sud au parc du Middelheim, à Anvers/Le Soir (Brussel) 2 August 1982
- Richter, Wolfgang: Die fünfeckige Welt des Gerard Caris/ Aachener Volkzeitung (Aachen) 21 August 1982
- V.d.Louw, Hennie: Caris‘ vijfhoekige huisjes/ Het Parool (Amsterdam) 28 August 1982
- Blij, F.v.d.: Ein Mathematiker betrachtet bildende Kunst/ Das Fünfeck/Mathematik lehren (Seelze), Heft 23, Aug. 1987
- Craats, Jan van de: Dodecaëder en vijfhoek/ N.R.C.Handelsblad (Rotterdam) 1 December 1987
- Stiemer, Flora: De macht van het perspectief/ Algemeen Dagblad (Amsterdam) 19 December 1987
- Souren, Marlies: Vijfhoek als kosmisch gegeven in het werk van Caris/Utrechts Nieuwsblad/ NZC(Utrecht) 24 December 1987
- Wittebrood, Nico: Het verboden kristal/Kijk (Haarlem) Januari 1988
- Vondermark, Dirk: Keine Energie für die schon existierende Formen/Düsseldorfer Nachrichten (Düsseldorf) 18 January 1988
- Esser, Ulrike B.: Gerard Caris und das Fünfeck/ Ratinger Wochenblatt (Ratingen) 18 January 1988
- Wingen, Ed: In de ban van de vijfhoek/Kunstbeeld (Amsterdam) Februari 1988
- Defesche, Pieter: „Dominicanenkerk model van goddelijk plan“Metafysisch voertuig voor Euregionale/ Limburgs Dagblad (Heerlen) 12 November 1988
- Van een gestrand ruimteschip tot vuursteen, vijfhoek en mail-art/ Het nieuwsblad (België) 19 November 1988
- Calmthout, Martijn van: Quasi-kristal geeft informatie over wereld met extra dimensie/Volkskrant (Amsterdam) 5 May 1990
- Vastrick, Waldy: Gerard Caris, veelzijdig kunstenaar/ Bijvoorbeeld nr.3 (Mijdrecht) 1990
- Arend, Heike: Die Entdeckung des Fünfeck/ Rheinpfalz (Ludwigshafen) 11 June 1991
- Loimeier, Manfred: Nieder mit den Vierecken/ Mannheimer Morgen (Mannheim) 11 June 1991
- Red: Meßbare Unendlichkeit/Wochenblatt (Ludwigshafen) 13 June 1991
- Meßbare Unendlichkeit/ Künstlerpost nr.7 (Ludwigshafen) Juni 1991
- Wingen, Ed: De vijfhoek van het artistieke denken/ Kunstbeeld (Amsterdam) Juni 1991
- Heiderich, Günter: Fünfeck als Form und Symbol/ Weser Kurier (Bremen) 7 September 1993
- Beßling, Rainer: Raum frei für das Fünfeck/Kreiszeitung Syke (Bremen) 9 September 1993
- Rummel, Ralf: Von Figur des Fünfecks fasziniert/ Nordwest Zeitung (Bremen) 29 September 1993
- Baan, Raymond: Het verboden kristal/Kunstbeeld (Amsterdam) Oktober 1993
- Beek, Willem v.: Gerard Caris en de eenheid in de schepping/ Kunstbeeld (Amsterdam) Oktober 1997
- Delft, Dirk v.: Een vijftallig universum/N.R.C.Handelsblad (Rotterdam) 22 October 1997
- Kagie, Rudie: Driedimensionale vijfhoek/Vrij Nederland (Amsterdam) 27 March 1999
- Augustijn, Piet: Driedimensionale vijfhoek: Het levenswerk van Gerard Caris/Beelden nr.2 - Dutch sculptors‘ association -driemaandelijks bulletin over beeldhouwkunst. (Rotterdam) ünfeck und seinen Möglichkeiten -Das Wilhelm- Hack-Museum in Ludwigshafen zeigt den niederländischen Künstler Gerard Caris/ Rheinpfalz (Ludwigshafen) 9 September 1999
- Wappler, Dietrich: Vom Fünfeck und seinen Möglichkeiten -Das Wilhelm-Hack-Museum in Ludwigshafen zeigt den niederländischen Künstler Gerard Caris/ Rheinpfalz (Ludwigshafen) 9 September 1999
- Heybrock, Christel: Sogar nachts träumt dieser Mann vom Fünfeck-Ausstellung: Der Holländer Gerard Caris wieder zu Gast im Hack-Museum Ludwigshafen/ Mannheimer Morgen (Mannheim) 9 September 1999
- Delft, Dirk v.: Het pakkende pentagon - Gerard Caris verkent grensgebied tussen kunst en wetenschap/ NRC Handelsblad (Rotterdam) 2 October 1999
- Straus, Cees: Hoe eigenzinnig is het gedrag van de vijfhoek/ Trouw (Amsterdam) 19 July 2000
- Beek, Willem v.: De gelijktijdigheid van helderheid en complexiteit / Kunstbeeld (Amsterdam) Oktober 2000
- Keune, Pieter: De kwintessens van het pentagon Onregelmatige herhaling bij Gerard Caris /KM vakinformatie voor beeldend kunstenaars en restauratoren(Amsterdam) najaar 2000
- Seidler, Uli: Wenn Kunst Gerard Caris: Wenn Kunst, Mathematik und Technik verschmelzen – Eine Ausstellung in der Theatergalerie zeigt Gerard Caris’ Pentagonforschungen/ Donaukurier (Ingolstadt) 25 September 2000
- Duking, Karen: Pentagon van Caris/ Dagblad De Limburger (Maastricht) 11 October 2001
- Romijn, Catharien: Constructivist Gerard Caris exposeert in Stedelijk Museum Amsterdam -Passie voor de vijfhoek/ Limburgs Dagblad (Heerlen) 13 October 2001
- Craats, Jan van de: Een pentagonale microcosmos / Nieuw Archief voor Wiskunde, uitgave van het Wiskundig Genootschap (Leiden) vijfde serie, deel 2, nummer 3, september 2001
- Craats, Jan van de: Geheimen van de vijfhoek / Pythagoras (Leiden) 41e jaargang nummer 1, oktober 2001
- Siepe, Leo: Een levenlang, radiouitzending AM 747 (Art as Life Radio broadcast AM 747) 2 October 2003
- Harle, Rob Book reviews in LEONARDO 2008: Gerard Caris: Pentagonismus/Pentagonism 2007, Gerard Caris: Art and Mathematics. New Reflections on the Pentagon. 1999, Tekeningen / Drawings S M A Cahiers 8 1997, Pentagonisme / Pentagonism. S M A Cahiers 23 2001 http://leonardo.info/reviews/jan2008/gerard_harle.html Friesland, Max van: Interview Gerard Caris July 2008 https://www.youtube.com/watch?v=KRL2JvrJe7E
- Mark A. Cheetham, The Crystal Interface in Contemporary Art: Metaphors of the Organic and Inorganic LEONARDO, Vol. 43, No3, pp. 250–255, 2010
- John Onians, “The Role of Experiential Knowledge in the Ultimate Design Studio: The Brain” Journal of Research Practice, Volume 6, Issue 2, Article M11, 2010 http://jrp.icaap.org/index.php/jrp/article/viewArticle/240/201
- Journal of Comparative Literature and Aesthetics, Volume : XXXV : Nos. 1-2 : 2012, A Symposium on the Art of Gerard Caris ISSN : 0252-8169
- Foreign artists praise Persian artworks / Tehran Times Art Desk Tehran, 15 February 2011
- Pentagonism, KUAD Gallery, Time out Istanbul September 2012, p. 70
- Artist Talk // Gerard Caris & Beral Madra An interview with Gerard Caris on art, science and his solo exhibition, “Pentagonism”. 18 September 2012 Interview organized on the occasion of Gerard Caris’s solo exhibition, “Pentagonism” at Kuad Gallery. Artist: Gerard Caris Kuad Gallery kuadgallery.com http://vimeo.com/56246248
- Harle, Rob Book review in LEONARDO 2012: Gerard Caris: Beşgencilik/Pentagonism by Ayşe Orhun Gültekin, Editor Kuad Gallery, Süleyman Seba Caddesi, Beşiktaş, Istanbul 2012 128 pp., illus. colour & b/w. Paper, http://leonardo.info/reviews/dec2012/gultekin-harle.php
- Gerard Caris Pentagonismus/Pentagonism.Verlag der Buchhandlung Walther König, Köln, ZKM | Museum für neue Kunst Karlsruhe 2007 ISBN 978-3-86560-251-0
