= Karas (food) =

Traditional food in Kedah

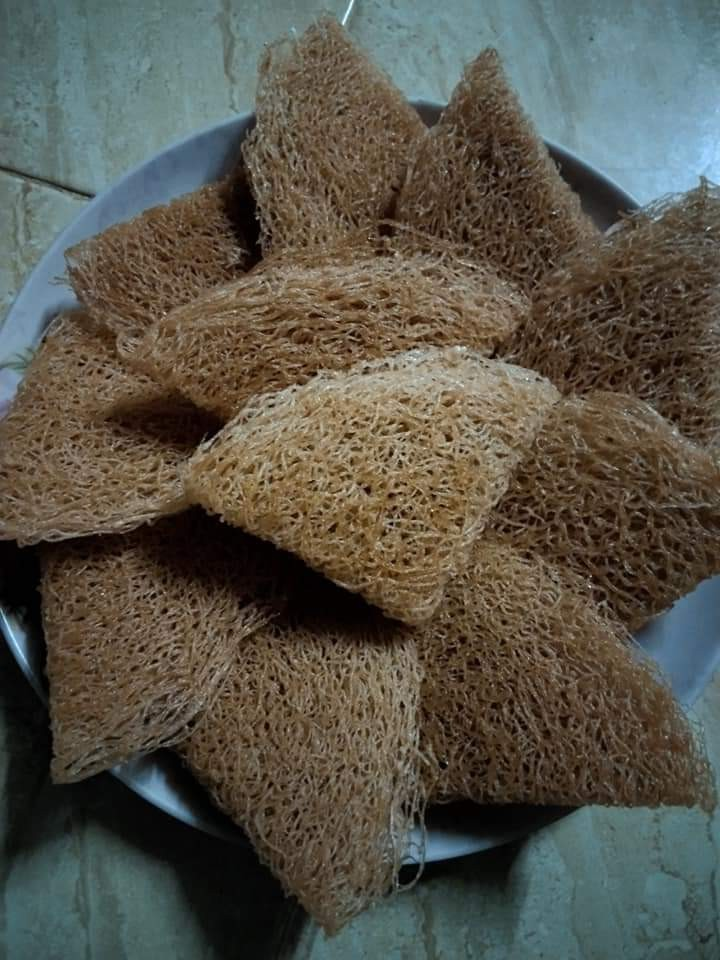
- Alternative names: Aasmi Traditional Sri Lankan sweet
- Type: Snack
- Place of origin: Sri Lanka, Malaysia, Brunei
- Region or state: Kedah, Borneo
- Created by: Sinhalese,Malay
- Main ingredients: Rice flour, sugar, cooking oil

Karas or Kuih Karas is a traditional food in Kedah. It is usually found in Kota Setar District. It is suitable to eat during tea time with a cup of hot coffee.

Kuih Karas can also be found in Borneo Island (Sabah, Sarawak and Brunei). This cake is a traditional cake made from rice flour. This cake looks like a net and uses a mold to make it. It also tastes sweet and crunchy.

== See also ==
- Cuisine of Malaysia
- Kuih
