= Cheryl J. Franklin =

Writer

- Born: 11 September 1955 (age 70); Pasadena, California

Cheryl J. Franklin (born 11 September 1955) is a science fiction and fantasy writer.

== Biography ==
Cheryl Jean Franklin was born in Pasadena, California, on 11 September 1955. Franklin graduated from the University of Redlands with a degree in Mathematics. After graduation she got a position as a systems analyst with Rockwell. Franklin worked as a communications systems analyst for Boeing in Anaheim in California from 1976 to 2001. Franklin suffered from vision issues and this was what initially prompted her to write. She created her first novels with DAW books and she has been a contributor for Locus Magazine. Her work was included in the DAW 30th Anniversary anthology. She is a member of Science Fiction Writers of America. Her work received good reviews and was well received.

== Bibliography ==
=== Taormin series ===
- Fire Get (1987)
- Fire Lord (1989)
- Tales of Taormin (omnibus, 2005)

=== Network/Consortium series ===
- The Light in Exile (1990)
- Fire Crossing (1991)
- The Inquisitor (1992)
- Ghost Shadow (1996)

=== Other novels ===
- Sable, Shadow, and Ice (1994)

=== Short fiction ===
- "Words" (2002)
