= SS Nerissa =

A number of steamships have been named Nerissa, including:-

- SS Nerissa (1882), a German cargo ship in service 1882-1928
- SS Nerissa (1926), a British cargo liner torpedoed and sunk in 1941
- SS Nerissa (1936), a German cargo ship in service 1936-1939, requisitioned by the Kriegsmarine, torpedoed and sunk in 1944
- SS Nerissa (1953), a German cargo ship in service 1953-1967
