= Arckiv =

London based fashion company

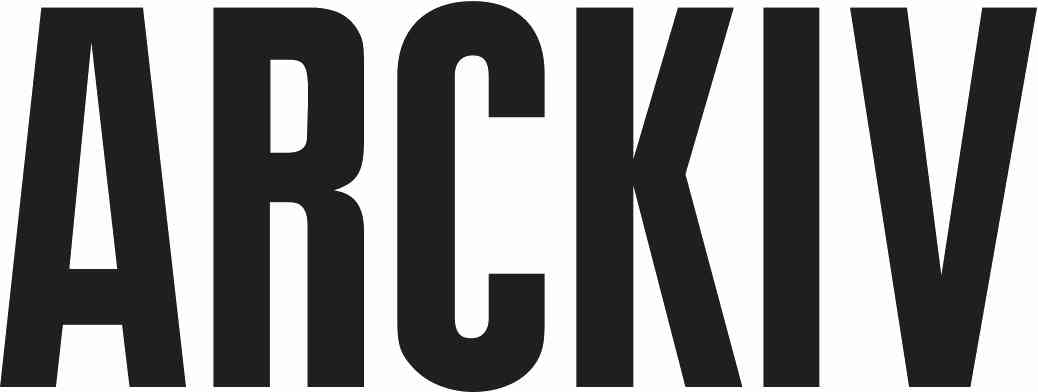
- Company type: Private company
- Industry: Fashion
- Founded: 1997; 29 years ago
- Founder: Fraser Laing
- Headquarters: London, United Kingdom
- Key people: Fraser Laing, creative director
- Products: Clothing; Accessories
- Website: www.arckiv.net

Arckiv (Russian: Архив: Archive) is a London-based fashion house that specialises in menswear fashion inspired by military and workwear. The company was founded in the late 1990s by Fraser Laing. Originally specialising in eyewear, Arckiv eventually became a menswear label in 2010 after its eyewear division became a separate company.

== History ==
Arckiv began as an eyewear specialist in the late 1990s, producing its original designs but being notable for its extensive library of museum grade, antique, prototype and vintage frames, quickly becoming a renowned specialist in eyewear. The company eventually moved into the design of clothing and accessories.

After splitting in 2010 to form two distinct companies, Arckiv became solely focused on menswear, while General Eyewear became a stand-alone company and brand formed from the continuation of the original eyewear division.

"When I first started doing it, I looked at a lot of magazines to work out what menswear is and how it works. I realised that suits are something I’m not interested in. The things I'm interested in are at the edge of society – military and workwear."

— Fraser Laing

Arckiv as a label took much of its inspiration from military uniforms and labourer workwear, and its collections were categorised into three separate lines entitled Nomadic (military), Ceremonial (dress wear) and Protective (labourer and workwear). The Arckiv fashion house presents only autumn/winter collections rather than the more archetypical two collections a year, which include spring/summer.

Arckiv presents its yearly collection on Menswear Day during London Fashion Week (September) and follows it in February with a curated exhibition of the brand in place of a spring/summer collection.

Since its first runway collection in 2010, Arckiv has been featured in numerous magazines, including Dazed & Confused, Arena Homme+ and LOVE Magazine and has been featured in a number of their fashion editorials.
