= Carissa (Galatia) =

Ancient town in Galatia, Turkey

Coordinates: 40°31′40″N 35°08′26″E

Carissa (Ancient Greek: Κάρισσα), also called Garsi, was a town of the Trocmi in ancient Galatia, Anatolia, located between Etonea and Amasya. It was inhabited during Roman and Byzantine times.

Its site is located near Elvan Çelebi, Asiatic Turkey.
