= Clara Mountcastle =

Canadian artist and author

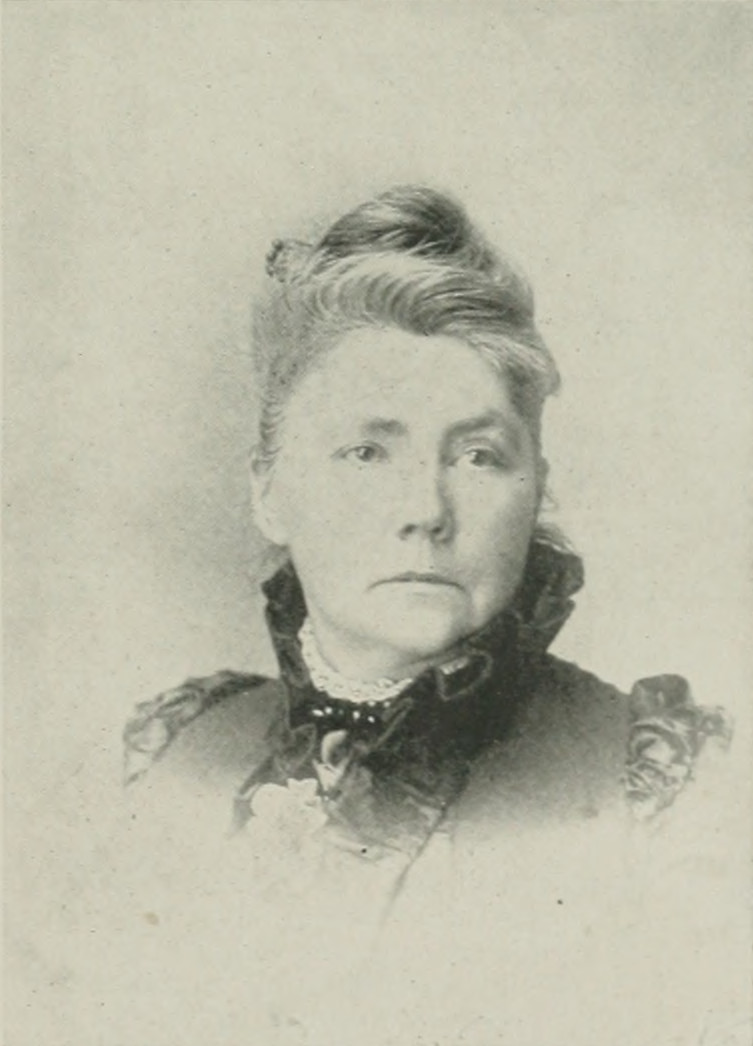
- Born: 26 November 1837; Huron Tract, Upper Canada
- Died: 24 May 1908 (aged 70); Clinton, Ontario, Canada
- Known for: Painter; Writer

Clara H. Mountcastle (26 November 1837 – 24 May 1908) was a Canadian artist and author who published her early work under the pseudonym Caris Sima.

== Early years and education ==
Clara H. Mountcastle was born in Clinton, Upper Canada in 1837, one of 12 children of Sidney Harmon Mountcastle, a farmer, and Frances Laura (Meikle) Mountcastle. Mountcastle received early art training from her mother, an amateur painter, and later (1855–1857) studied art in Toronto while living with her uncle John George Howard, an architect. At that time she attended a private girls' school for a term and took instruction from an English artist, one Chatterton, in working from nature. By 1881, she had returned to Clinton, where she lived with two of her sisters for the remainder of her life.

== Career ==
Mountcastle's watercolours won five prizes at the 1870 Provincial Exhibition in Toronto. She continued exhibiting at provincial and national exhibitions through the 1880s. Critics noted her skill with traditional marine subjects. In 1897, as the new Impressionist style gained favor, her work was rejected by the Ontario Society of Artists, where she had previously exhibited, and she was also prevented from joining the society. She joined the Women's Art Association of Canada instead.

Mountcastle's writing career did not begin until the 1880s. She published both poetry and prose and also gave dramatic readings of her work. Her first two books, The Mission of Love (poems, 1882) and A Mystery (novella, 1886) came out under the pseudonym Caris Sima, which she derived from her childhood nickname of 'Carissima'. Her third book, Is Marriage a Failure? (essay, 1899), came out under her own name. She earned praise for her ability to write poems in a wide range of forms spanning from hymns to dialect verse, though she did not handle all equally well and her poems tended towards conventional sentimentality rather than originality. Recurring subjects included rural life, ill-fated love, and attacks on critics. Her meditations on aging and poverty speak to the struggles of genteel poverty which many women of her day faced, including the Mountcastle sisters.

She died of kidney cancer in 1908.

== Publications ==
- The Mission of Love (poems, 1882)
- A Mystery (novella, 1886)
- Is Marriage a Failure? (essay, 1899)
