= Sara Hennessy =

British scholar

- Born: London, England
- Education: London School of Economics and Political Science, University College London, University of Cambridge
- Occupations: Professor, scholar

Sara Hennessy is a British scholar. As of 2022, she is a professor of educational dialogue and pedagogical inquiry in the Faculty of Education at the University of Cambridge. Hennessy is a Fellow of Hughes Hall college.

She serves as a founding member and leader of the Cambridge Educational Dialogue Research (CEDiR) Group. Aside from educational dialogue, she has worked in the field of EdTech for over three decades, focusing particularly on professional development, teacher inquiry, and interactive pedagogy, including in sub-Saharan Africa. She was a research director of EdTech Hub, a multi-million-pound 8-year program funded by the UK's Foreign, Commonwealth and Development Office, and previously editor of the British Journal of Educational Technology.

== Biography ==
Hennessy graduated with a Bachelor of Science in Social Psychology from the London School of Economics and Political Science in 1981 and a Masters of Arts from the University of Cambridge. She also holds a PhD in Psychology from the University College London.

Hennessy was a Research Fellow at the Institute of Educational Technology, Open University from 1986 to 1999 before becoming a Senior Research Associate from 1999-2007 and then Lecturer in Teacher Development and Pedagogical Innovation at the University of Cambridge in 2007 until 2011. She was a Senior Lecturer at the university from 2011 until 2015 and a Reader from 2015 until 2021 when she became a professor.

== Publications and research projects ==
Her up to date publications list and research projects can be found at https://faculty.educ.cam.ac.uk/people/staff/hennessy.
