= Batracharta =

Scientific classification
- Kingdom: Animalia
- Phylum: Arthropoda
- Class: Insecta
- Order: Lepidoptera
- Superfamily: Noctuoidea
- Family: Erebidae
- Subfamily: Calpinae
- Genus: Batracharta; Walker, 1862

Synonyms
- Carissa Walker, 1863; Pilosocrures Hampson, 1891

Genus of moths

Batracharta is a genus of moths of the family Erebidae. The genus was erected by Francis Walker in 1862.

== Species ==
- Batracharta albistrigosata Warren, 1915 north-eastern Himalayas, Thailand
- Batracharta chariessa A. E. Prout, 1928 Sumatra
- Batracharta chinensis Hampson, 1926 China (Jiujiang)
- Batracharta cossoides Walker, [1863] Borneo, Sumatra, Sulawesi
- Batracharta divisa Wileman, 1914 Thailand, Peninsular Malaysia, Taiwan, Borneo, Sulawesi
- Batracharta irrorata Hampson, 1894 India (Manipur)
- Batracharta lempkei Kobes, 1989 Thailand, Sumatra, Borneo, Sulawesi
- Batracharta nigritogata A. E. Prout, 1921 Peninsular Malaysia, Borneo, Sulawesi
- Batracharta obliqua Walker, 1862 southern India, Thailand, Peninsular Malaysia, Sumatra, Borneo, Philippines, Sulawesi
- Batracharta proutae Holloway, 2005 Borneo, Sumatra
- Batracharta walkeri Bethune-Baker, 1910 New Guinea
