= Steve Cherelle =

English country/folk music singer and songwriter

Steve Cherelle (born February 1970) is an English country/folk music singer and songwriter. He was raised in Essex, England.

== Biography ==
Best known for his John Denver tribute act, Cherelle appeared on Stars in Their Eyes in 1996 as Denver performing "Annie's Song". This is what launched his music career and he joined the Forever In Blues Jeans cast in 1998, alongside Garry Dorsey and toured the whole of the UK. He released his first album Wonderful Today's which won album of the year and its title track, written by Cherelle himself, won song of the year at the UK Country Radio Awards in 1999; and Cherelle repeated this same feat with "Fallin' In, Fallin' Out" in 2000. Cherelle completed the hat-trick when the song "You're My True North", inspired by the film Message In A Bottle, also won best song at the 2001 awards. The show is now hosted by Cherelle each year at the Lakeside Country Club at Frimley Green in Surrey, England.

Cherelle says his favourite male country singer is Randy Travis and his favourite female country singer is Emmylou Harris and he counts John Denver, Neil Diamond, The Eagles, and Paul Overstreet among his influences. Aside from his love of music, Cherelle is also a movie buff and is a fan of The Apprentice.

== "Essex Country" features ==
- Top of the Tree at 3 – The current American Billboard No.1 country single, played after the news at 3pm.
- Country Music News – What happened this week in country music history
- Pop Goes The Country – A pop song that has been covered by a country artist or vice versa
- Should Have Been A Hit – A song that should have been a hit but wasn't
- Steve's Sunday Smooch – A love song requested by the listeners
- Classic Country Corner – Three classic country music songs in a row
