= Robb W. Glenny =

American physician

Robb W. Glenny is an American pulmonologist.

Glenny graduated from the University of Virginia School of Medicine in 1984, and completed a fellowship at the University of Washington, followed by a residency and internship at Duke University Medical Center. He later returned to the University of Washington where he holds an endowed professorship in pulmonary research. In 1999, Glenny was awarded a Guggenheim fellowship.
