= Dilys =

Dilys is a feminine given name and virtue name of Welsh origin, which translates into English as genuine, steadfast, valid, true or perfect. It seems to have first appeared in the mid-nineteenth century.

The name may refer to:

== People ==
- Dilys Breese (1932–2007), British filmmaker and television producer. (See also: The Dilys Breese Medal below.)
- Dilys Cadwaladr (1902–1979), Welsh poet
- Dilys Craven (1919–2008), Australian paediatrician
- Dilys Grace Edmunds (1879–1926), Welsh teacher in India
- Dilys Elwyn-Edwards (1918–2012), Welsh musician
- Dilys Hamlett (1928–2002), English actress
- Dilys Laing (1906–1960), American poet
- Dilys Laye (1934–2009), English actress and screenwriter
- Dilys Powell (1901–1995), British journalist and writer
- Dilys Price (1932–2020), Welsh educator, parachutist, and model
- Dilys Rose (born 1954), Scottish poet and writer
- Dilys Watling (1943–2021), English actress
- Dilys Winn (1939–2016), American bookseller (see also: The Dilys Award below)

== Fictional characters ==
- Professor Dilys Derwent, a witch, healer and former headmistress of Hogwarts in the Harry Potter book and film series
- Dilys Price, from the animated British TV series Fireman Sam
