= Dilys Grace Edmunds =

British teacher

Dilys Grace Edmunds (1879–1926), an early twentieth century teacher in India from a Welsh Calvinistic Methodist background, whose fund-raising work supported school building programmes in the Karimanj District of India.

Dilys Edmunds was born in London in 1879. Her father was Mr Llewelyn Edmunds, the precentor at Bethel Chapel, Wilton Square, in Islington, London (a chapel built by Welsh Calvinistic Methodists in 1853, rebuilt 1884). Such Welsh Methodists had their origins in the religious revival of the eighteenth century, and had been influenced by George Whitfield and his patron, Selina, Countess of Huntingdon.

After attending a school in London, Dilys Edmunds studied at the University College of Wales in Aberystwyth where she gained a bachelor of arts degree, followed by completion of a teachers' training course. Her teaching career began in London, but in 1914 as war broke out in Europe, she sailed to India, funded by a Welsh missionary society, to teach at a secondary school in Silchar. Two years later she was offered a post in charge of the Girls' School at Karimganj. Whilst there she wrote numerous articles about the customs and culture of local people for the Welsh monthly periodical Y Cenhadwr

Returning to Britain after the end of World War One, arriving towards the end of 1920 and staying for about a year, she raised funds in London and Wales for a building programme to provide residential hostels for Indian teachers, accommodation for school children in the Karimanj District, and to establish a 'School of Weaving' for the Girls' School at Karimganj.

Coming back to London again in 1925, this time to care for her mother who was unwell, she herself took ill and died suddenly in a London hospital on 17 April 1926.

Dilys Edmunds was buried at Abney Park Cemetery in Stoke Newington, London.

== Sources ==
- Rees, D. (2002) Vehicles of Grace and Hope: Welsh Missionaries in India 1800-1970
- Morris, John Hughes (1996) The History of the Welsh Calvinistic Methodists' Foreign Mission
