= Corissa Vella =

Maltese footballer

Personal information
- Full name: Corissa Vella White
- Birth name: Corissa Vella
- Date of birth: 19 March 1988 (age 38)
- Position: Midfielder

Senior career*
| Years | Team | Apps | (Gls) |
- Hibernians

International career^{‡}
| 2009–2011 | Malta | 7 | (0) |
- * Club domestic league appearances and goals ‡ National team caps and goals as of 8 March 2011

Corissa Vella White (née Vella; born 19 March 1988), known as Corissa Vella, is a Maltese footballer who plays as a midfielder. She has officially played for the senior Malta women's national team.

== International career ==
Vella capped for Malta at senior level, playing during the 2011 FIFA Women's World Cup qualification – UEFA Group 5 and the UEFA Women's Euro 2013 qualifying (preliminary round).
