= Cerys =

- Pronunciation: Southern Welsh pronunciation: [ˈkɛrɪs], Northern Welsh pronunciation: [ˈkɛrɨ̞s]
- Gender: Female

Origin
- Origin: Welsh
- Meaning: "Love", "Loved one"

Other names
- Related names: Caris, Karis, Ceris, Karys, Carys, Carissa, Cheryl, Cara, Cherie

Cerys is a Welsh feminine given name. It is a variant of Carys.

Cerys may refer to:

- Cerys Hale (born 1995), Welsh rugby union player
- Cerys Matthews (born 1971), Welsh singer and songwriter
- Cerys an Craite, a fictional character in the video game The Witcher 3: Wild Hunt (2015)
