= Kadikoi =

Coordinates: 44.5167°N 33.5944°E

Kadikoi (Crimean Tatar: Qadıköy, Russian: Кадыкой) in the 19th century was a village on the Crimean peninsula, in Ukraine, about one mile north of Balaklava. The Battle of Balaclava (also known as the Battle of Kadikoi to Russian historians) was fought on the hills and valleys to the north of Kadikoi in 1854. The village was later known as Kadykovka (Кадыковка), and Pryhorodne (Пригородне). Currently it's merged into Balaklava city, and is known as microdistrict Kadykovka. Its original Crimean Tatar name means literally "village of a judge" (qadı - judge, köy - village).

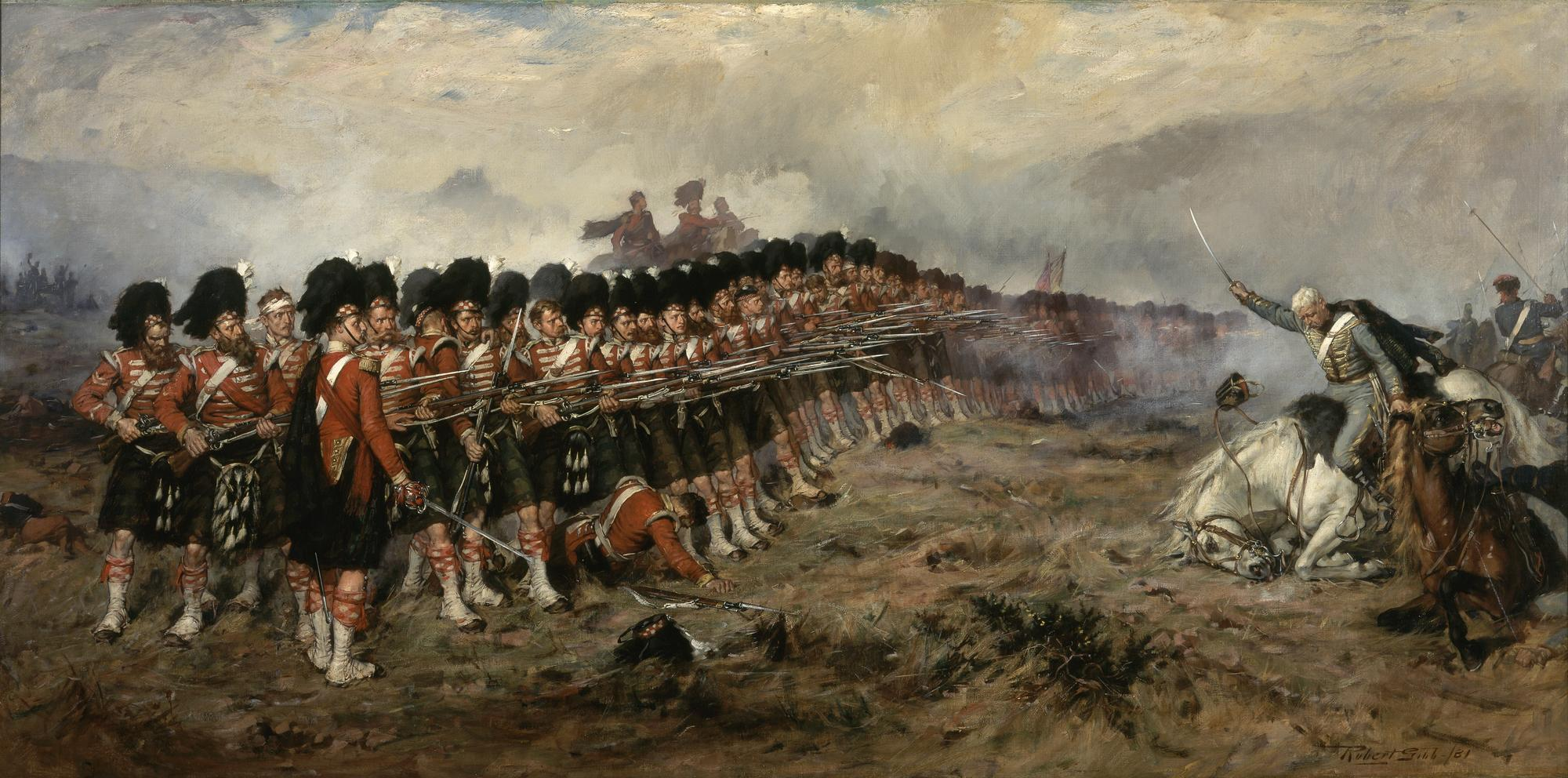
Robert Gibb, The Thin Red Line, 1881

The British Army built a stationary engine on a hillside near the village, to up haul trains carrying men and materiel.

Another hill, slightly to the north and east of Kadikoi, was defended by six companies of the 93rd (Highland) Regiment (the Sutherland Highlanders, around 600 soldiers), a Turkish battalion (around 1,000 soldiers), and a six-gun battery of field artillery. The hill was attacked by a large force of Russian cavalry on 25 October 1854, but repulsed by the British "Thin Red Line". The Heavy Brigade charged the stalled Russian cavalry in the South Valley slightly to the north, followed later by the charge of the Light Brigade in the North Valley, a few miles further north.
