= Nerissa (given name) =

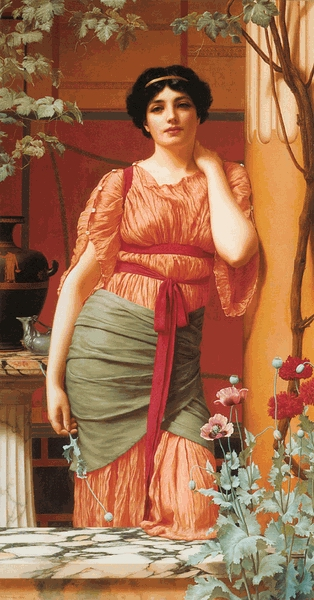
John William Godward (1861–1922), Nerissa

Nerissa is a feminine given name, and may refer to:

- Nerissa Bowes-Lyon (1919–1986), cousin of Queen Elizabeth II, subject of the Channel 4 documentary "The Queen's Hidden Cousins", depicted in the seventh episode of the fourth season of The Crown
- Nerissa Bretania Underwood (born 1955), Guamanian politician
- Nerissa Brockenburr Stickney (1913–1960), American pianist
- Nerissa Chesterfield, British political aide
- Nerissa Corazon Soon-Ruiz (born 1956), Filipino politician
- Nerissa Nields, American rock and folk musician
- Thea Nerissa Barnes (1952–2018), American professional dancer
- Nerissa Ravencroft, virtual YouTuber

== Fictional characters ==
- Nerissa, in William Shakespeare's play The Merchant of Venice
- Nerissa (W.I.T.C.H.), an antagonist in the comic book and TV series W.I.T.C.H.
- Queen Narissa, the arch-villain from the 2007 Disney film Enchanted
- Queen Nerissa, the real identity of Chelsea Van Der Zee from Ruby Gillman, Teenage Kraken
