= Sherrill (surname) =

Sherrill is an English surname.

== People ==
Notable American people with the surname include:

- Billy Sherrill (1936–2015), American country-music producer
- Charles H. Sherrill (1814–1887), New York politician
- Charles H. Sherrill (ambassador) (1867–1936), American diplomat
- Clarence O. Sherrill (1876–1959), American military officer and city manager
- George Sherrill (born 1977), baseball relief pitcher
- Jackie Sherrill (born 1943), football coach
- John and Elizabeth Sherrill (John 1923–2017, Elizabeth 1928–2023), Christian writers
- Junior Sherrill (born 2005), American football player
- Mary Lura Sherrill (1888–1968), American chemist
- Mikie Sherrill (Rebecca Michelle Sherrill) (born 1972), American politician
- Patrick Sherrill (1941–1986), mass murderer who perpetrated the August 20, 1986, Edmond post office shooting
- Robert Sherrill (1924–2014), American investigative journalist
- Wilma M. Sherrill (1939–2025), American politician

== See also ==
- Aqeela Sherrills, a campaigner against gang violence
