= Caris Roane =

American novelist

- Occupation: Novelist
- Writing career
- Language: English
- Genre: paranormal romance

Caris Roane is an author of paranormal romance novels. As Valerie King she is also the author of Regency romance novels and won a 2005 Career Achievement Award for Regency Romance from Romantic Times.

== The Guardians of Ascension Series ==
Caris Roane’s Guardians of Ascension series is about winged vampire warriors sworn to protect human women.

== Bibliography ==
=== The Guardians of Ascension Series ===
1. Ascension, St. Martin’s Press, 2010
2. Burning Skies, St. Martin’s Press, 2011
3. Wings of Fire, St. Martin’s Press, 2011
4. Brink of Eternity, St. Martin’s Press, 2011
5. Born of Ashes, St. Martin’s Press, 2012
6. Obsidian Flame, St. Martin’s Press, 2012
7. Gates of Rapture, St. Martin's Press, 2012

=== The Blood Rose Series ===
- Embrace the Dark, Spencerhill Associates, 2012
- Embrace the Magic,
- Embrace the Mystery,
- Embrace the Passion,
- Embrace the Night,
- Embrace the Wild,
- Embrace the Wind,

=== Men in Chains ===
- Born in Chains, St. Martin's Press, 2013
- Savage Chains, St. Martin's Press, 2014
- Chains of Darkness, St. Martin's Press, 2014
- Savage Chains: Captured (#1), St. Martin's Press, 2014
- Savage Chains: Scarred (#2), St. Martin's Press, 2014
- Savage Chains: Shattered (#3), St. Martin's Press, 2014
- Unchained St. Martin's Press, 2014
