= Stonecroft Ministries =

Stonecroft Ministries is a non-denominational, non-profit Christian organization that prepares women to lead Christian groups within their communities. According to a legal filing, Stonecroft looks to "equip and encourage women to impact their communities with the Gospel of Jesus Christ."

Founded in the United States by Helen Duff Baugh in 1938, Stonecroft is now an international organization that is headquartered in Kansas City, Missouri. Regional offices headed by field directors operate throughout the U.S. As of 2009, over 40,000 volunteers were serving in 64 countries.

== Activities ==
Stonecroft provides internships, mentoring, and training events at the international, regional, and local levels.

=== Training ===
Stonecroft plans and hosts evangelical leadership training events at the international, regional, and local levels. International Impact events are held on even years. Regional events are held annually. Local topical events are held throughout the year.

=== Mentoring ===
At the local level, Stonecroft mentors lead small group or individual Bible studies. At the regional level, mentors cover large areas, organizing and training volunteers to guide Stonecroft Bible Studies.

=== Internships ===
Stonecroft invites college juniors and seniors, post-graduate students, and recent college graduates to apply for specialized 10-week internships. Successful applicants serve at the Stonecroft headquarters. These interns can live on the grounds during their internship. Field interns serve with their respective field director at various locations around the U.S.

Interns receive training and acquire new skills while being mentored in the inner workings of specific departments of ministry, including Communications, Outreach, and Special Events.

== Connections ==
=== Stonecroft Bible Studies ===
Eighteen Stonecroft Bible Studies are currently in use (2009). Each one focuses on a specific topic or book of the Bible, and is intended for use with the Good News New Testament. Scripture references in the studies are linked to a specific page number in the Good News New Testament making locating verses easier for study participants who are unfamiliar with the Bible. The first Stonecroft Bible Studies were published in 1968.

==== Life Publications ====
Since event attendees and people interacting with Stonecroft volunteers on a one-to-one basis may have limited or no previous exposure to religious teaching, Stonecroft Bible Studies and Stonecroft Life Publications present basic Christian principles..

=== Connection groups ===
More than 1.5 million people attended Stonecroft outreach events in the U.S. and Canada during 2007 and 2008. These events can range from luncheons with speakers to community projects, from prison ministry to parenting workshops, from beach Bible studies to arctic outreach. Examples include:

- Moms on the Run is a Stonecroft outreach event for mothers of young children..
- Vital Network is a group of women, usually connected through an existing Stonecroft outreach group. Vital Network functions as a Stonecroft Ministries group,

== Facilities ==
The Baugh Center includes 33 overnight guest rooms, meeting rooms and a chapel. \

Built in the 1920s, the stone Manor served as the office and living quarters for Stonecroft staff when the property was purchased in 1952. It now houses guest quarters and meeting rooms. Sadly, throughout covid shut down, Stonecroft lost much of its income as the support groups were not allowed to meet. The ministry no longer has a headquarter but staff is working from home. Hopefully as local connection clubs begin to meet again, their income will increase, and a new building will be purchased.

== History ==
Much of the history of Stonecroft is recorded the book written by Helen Duff Baugh, The Story Goes On (Stonecroft Publications, 1984), and her biography by Steve and Annie Wamberg, One Woman, One Faith, One Vision (Bethany Press, 2008).

The idea for Stonecroft started in 1938 when a young woman who had recently lost her mother sought spiritual counseling from banker Elwood Baugh at his office. Elwood and his wife, Helen Duff Baugh, invited the young woman and nine coworkers to meet a restaurant and talk about how Christians get to heaven.

Several attendees at this meeting requested that the group meet again so they could invite their friends to attend. This original dinner with Elwood and Baugh led to the creation of 24 prayer groups in San Jose, California. These groups formed the basis of Stonecroft.

In 1948, Mary E. Clark, a former businesswoman and missionary, joined Helen Baugh in leading Stonecroft. Clark was instrumental in establishing Christian Women's Clubs. These clubs provided lunchtime meetings with catered meals and special speakers.

In 1952, Helen Baugh and Clark moved the ministry headquarters to Stonecroft, a tract of land in South Kansas City, Missouri. The prayer groups, Bible studies, and outreach events were soon referred to as Stonecroft Ministries.

The first Life Publications booklet, Life Eternally Yours, was published in 1962. In 1968, Stonecroft started publishing its Stonecroft Bible Studies books. Friendship Bible Coffees (now called Stonecroft Bible Studies) also launched in 1968.

Stonecroft went international in 1966, as the first outreach groups outside the U.S. began in Canada and South Korea. In 1973, for the first time, Stonecroft councils and clubs were active in all 50 states.

Stonecroft's first regional field directors were appointed in 2006, and in 2007, college-aged women began arriving at the Home Office in Kansas City for 10-week internships.

== Accountability ==
Stonecroft is a member of the Evangelical Council for Financial Accountability (ECFA). As a member, Stonecroft must meet rigorous standards of accountability in such areas as fundraising, financial disclosure, confidentiality of donor information, and the use of resources. The ministry submits to an annual independent audit. Local small groups are limited to $1,000 in their holdings and the rest of the funds go to Stonecroft. Local accounts must have the board manager's name on the checks.

Stonecroft is governed by an independent board of directors which oversees the ministry's mission, finances, management, conduct, and ethical decisions.
