= Glenys =

Glenys, a Welsh female given name meaning "clean" or "holy".

Glenys, Glennys or Glennis may refer to:

== Glenys ==
- Glenys Bakker (born 1962), Canadian curler from Calgary, Alberta
- Glenys Barton, sculptor working mainly in ceramic and bronze
- Glenys Beasley (born 1944), Australian sprinter
- Glenys Fowles AM (born 1941), Australian operatic soprano
- Glenys Kinnock, Baroness Kinnock of Holyhead (born 1944), British politician
- Glenys Page (1940–2012), New Zealand cricketer
- Glenys Quick (born 1957), retired long-distance runner from New Zealand
- Glenys Thornton, Baroness Thornton (born 1952), Labour and Co-operative member of the UK House of Lords

== Glennys ==
- Glennys Farrar, American particle physicist and cosmologist
- Glennys L. McVeigh, Canadian Federal Court judge
- Glennys Young, American historian

== Glennis ==
- Glennis Grace (born 1978), Dutch singer
- Glennis Lorimer (1913–1968), British actress
- Glennis Yeager (1924–1990), wife of Air Force test pilot Chuck Yeager, who named several of his planes Glamorous Glennis for her, including the supersonic Bell X-1

== See also ==
- Glennes
- Glynis (disambiguation)
