= Ceri (disambiguation) =

Ceri is a town in Lazio, Italy.

Ceri may also refer to:

== People ==
- Ceri Dallimore (born 1974), Welsh sport shooter
- Ceri Richards (1903–1971), Welsh artist
- Ceri Warnock, British-born New Zealand environmental legal scholar
- Luciano Ceri (born 1951), Italian singer-songwriter, journalist and radio host
- Renzo da Ceri (c. 1476–1536), Italian condottiero
- Siôn Ceri (fl. 16th-century), Welsh language poet

== Places ==
- Cêri, a village in Tibet

== See also ==
- Cerri, an Italian surname
- Cherry (disambiguation)
- Chieri (disambiguation)
- Kerry (disambiguation)
- Keri (disambiguation)
