= Keri (disambiguation) =

Keri is a Hebrew term which literally means "happenstance", "frivolity" or "contrariness" and has come to mean "seminal emission".

KERI is a radio station licensed to Bakersfield, California, U.S.

Keri or KERI may also refer to:

== Places ==
- Keri (island), an island of Estonia in the Gulf of Finland
- Keri, Järva County, a village in Koigi Parish, Järva County Estonia
- Keri, Greece, a village and a community of the island of Zakynthos
- Keri River, a river in Gujarat, India

== Other uses ==
- Keri Lotion, a brand of moisturizing lotion by Novartis Consumer Health
- Korea Electrotechnology Research Institute, a research institute in the Republic of Korea
- Erie International Airport's ICAO code
- Keri, the nom-de-guerre of Armenian fedayi commander Arshak Gavafian.

== People with the surname ==
- Jonah Keri (born 1974), Canadian journalist, sportswriter and editor
- Mihalj Keri (born 1951), retired Yugoslavian association football player
- Pilo Keri (born 1956), member of the Parliament of Republic of Albania

== People with the given name ==
- Keri Arthur, Australian novelist
- Keri Blakinger, American journalist and author
- Keri Chaconas (born 1974), American basketball player and coach
- Keri Collins (born 1978), Welsh screenwriter and director
- Keri Davies, Welsh radio producer and playwright
- Keri Healey, American voice actress
- Keri Hehn (born 1981), American swimmer
- Keri Herman (born 1982), American freestyle skier
- Keri Hilson (born 1982), American singer, songwriter and actress
- Keri Hulme (1947–2021), New Zealand writer
- Keri Jones (born 1969), British radio executive
- Keri Jones (rugby), (born 1945), Welsh rugby player
- Keri Kelli (born 1971), American hard rock guitarist
- Keri Noble (born 1975), American singer-songwriter
- Keri Lynn Pratt (born 1978), American actress
- Keri Russell (born 1976), American actress and dancer
- Keri Sanchez (born 1972), American former soccer defender
- Keri Smith, author, illustrator, guerrilla artist, and blogger

== See also ==
- Ceri (disambiguation)
- Kerrie
- Kerry (disambiguation)
