= Pilo =

Pilo may refer to:

== People ==
=== Surname ===
- Carl Gustaf Pilo (1711–1793), Swedish artist and painter
- Craig Pilo (b. 1972), American drummer
- Rosolino Pilo (1820–1860), Italian patriot

=== Given name ===
- Pilo Hilbay (born 1973), Filipino lawyer
- Pilo Keri (born 1956), Albanian politician
- Pilo Peristeri (1909–2009), Albanian politician

== Other ==
- Pilo, the Hawaiian name for kadua laxiflora, a rare species of flowering plant
- Mehro Pilo, historic village in Pakistan
- Italian destroyer Rosolino Pilo, an Italian naval ship
