= Kerry =

Kerry or Kerri may refer to:

== People ==
- Kerry (name), a given name and surname of Gaelic origin, including a list of people with the name

== Places ==
- Kerry, Queensland, Australia, a rural community
- County Kerry, Ireland
  - Kerry Airport, an international airport in County Kerry, Ireland
  - Kerry Head, a headland
- Kerry, Powys, Wales, a village
- Kerry Park, Seattle, Washington, US, a park
- Kerry (Dáil constituency), an Irish parliamentary constituency
- County Kerry (Parliament of Ireland constituency)
- County Kerry (UK Parliament constituency)

== Businesses ==
- Kerry Group, a food company in Ireland
- Kerry Properties, a property developer in Hong Kong
  - Kerry Logistics, a spinoff company

== Sports ==
- Kerry F.C. (Ireland), an association football club based in Tralee, County Kerry
- Kerry F.C. (Wales), an association football club based in Kerry, Powys
- Kerry GAA, a governing body of Gaelic games in County Kerry
  - Kerry county football team, a Gaelic football team
  - Kerry county hurling team

== Other uses ==
- Earl of Kerry, an ancient title in the Peerage of Ireland
- List of storms named Kerry, four tropical cyclones
- Kerry cattle, a rare breed of dairy cattle native to Ireland
- Kerry, a person with no knees

== See also ==
- Kerry Town, Sierra Leone, a village
- Ceri (disambiguation)
- Kelley (disambiguation)
- Kelly (disambiguation)
- Keri (disambiguation)
- Kerrie
