= Chiari =

Chiari may refer to:

- Chiari (surname)
- Chiari, Lombardy, a commune in Italy
- The Chiari Institute, a medical institution in Great Neck, New York
- Battle of Chiari (1701), part of the War of the Spanish Succession

== See also ==
- Arnold–Chiari malformation, a malformation of the brain
- Chari (disambiguation)
- Chieri (disambiguation)
