= Cerri =

Cerri is an Italian surname. Notable people with the surname include:

- Alberto Cerri (born 1996), Italian footballer
- Claudio Cerri (born 1960), Italian cyclist
- Dick Cerri (1936–2013), American radio DJ
- Franco Cerri (1926–2021), Italian guitarist
- Leonardo Cerri (born 2003), Italian footballer

== See also ==
- Ceri, a town in Lazio, Italy
  - Ceri (disambiguation)
