= Livio Odescalchi =

Italian nobleman (1652–1713)

- Duke of Ceri; Gonfalonier of the Church
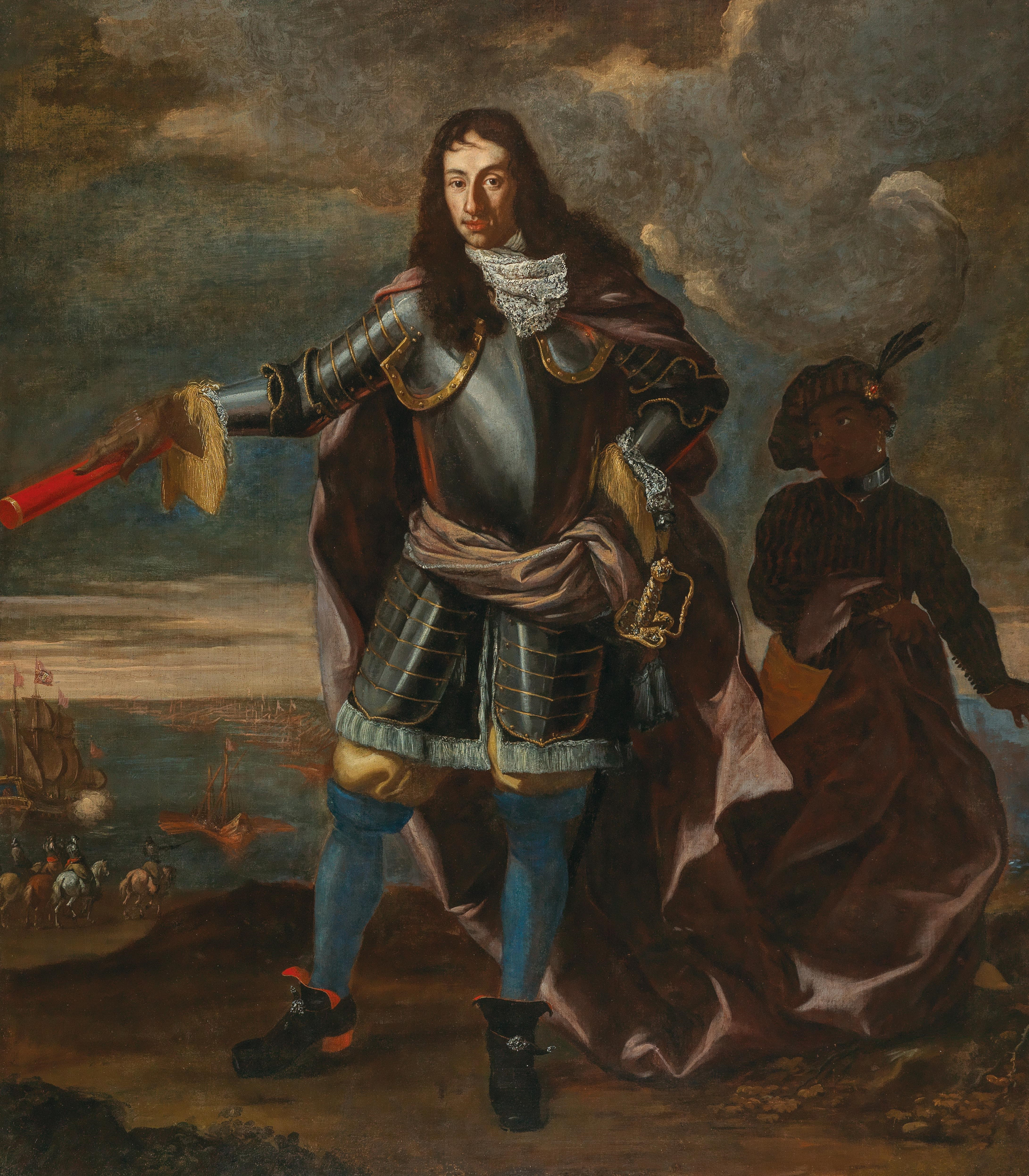
- Born: 10 March 1652; Rome, Papal States
- Died: 8 September 1713 (aged 61); Rome, Papal States
- Noble family: Odescalchi
- Father: Carlo Odescalchi
- Mother: Beatrice Cusani
- Military career
- Allegiance: Papal States
- Service years: 1676–1689
- Rank: Captain-General of the Church
- Conflicts: Ottoman-Habsburg Wars: Battle of Vienna

Livio Odescalchi (March 10, 1652 — September 8, 1713), Duke of Bracciano, Ceri and Sirmium, was an Italian nobleman of the Odescalchi family.

== Biography ==
Livio Odescalchi was born in Rome in 1655, the son of Carlo Odescalchi (1607-1673) and Beatrice Cusani. His paternal uncle was Benedetto Odescalchi, who was elected to the papacy as Pope Innocent XI in 1676. Since Innocent wanted to put an end to the established nepotism of the Curia, he did not make his nephew a cardinal, but instead granted Livio his own personal fortune of some forty thousand crowns, and conferred upon him his own title as Duke of Ceri in 1678. Livio was however eventually made Gonfaloniere and Captain General of the Church by his uncle.

Livio later helped Innocent finance the expedition led by John Sobieski that ended the Turkish siege at the Battle of Vienna in 1683. Odescalchi himself fought with distinction in the battle, and was made an Imperial Prince and given the title Duke of Syrmia (lat. Dux Sirmii), and also the possession of Ilok Castle, by the grateful Leopold I, Holy Roman Emperor. He was also made a Grandee of Spain.

In 1696, Odescalchi bought the title Duke of Bracciano from the Bracciano branch of the Orsini family, along with the famous castle.

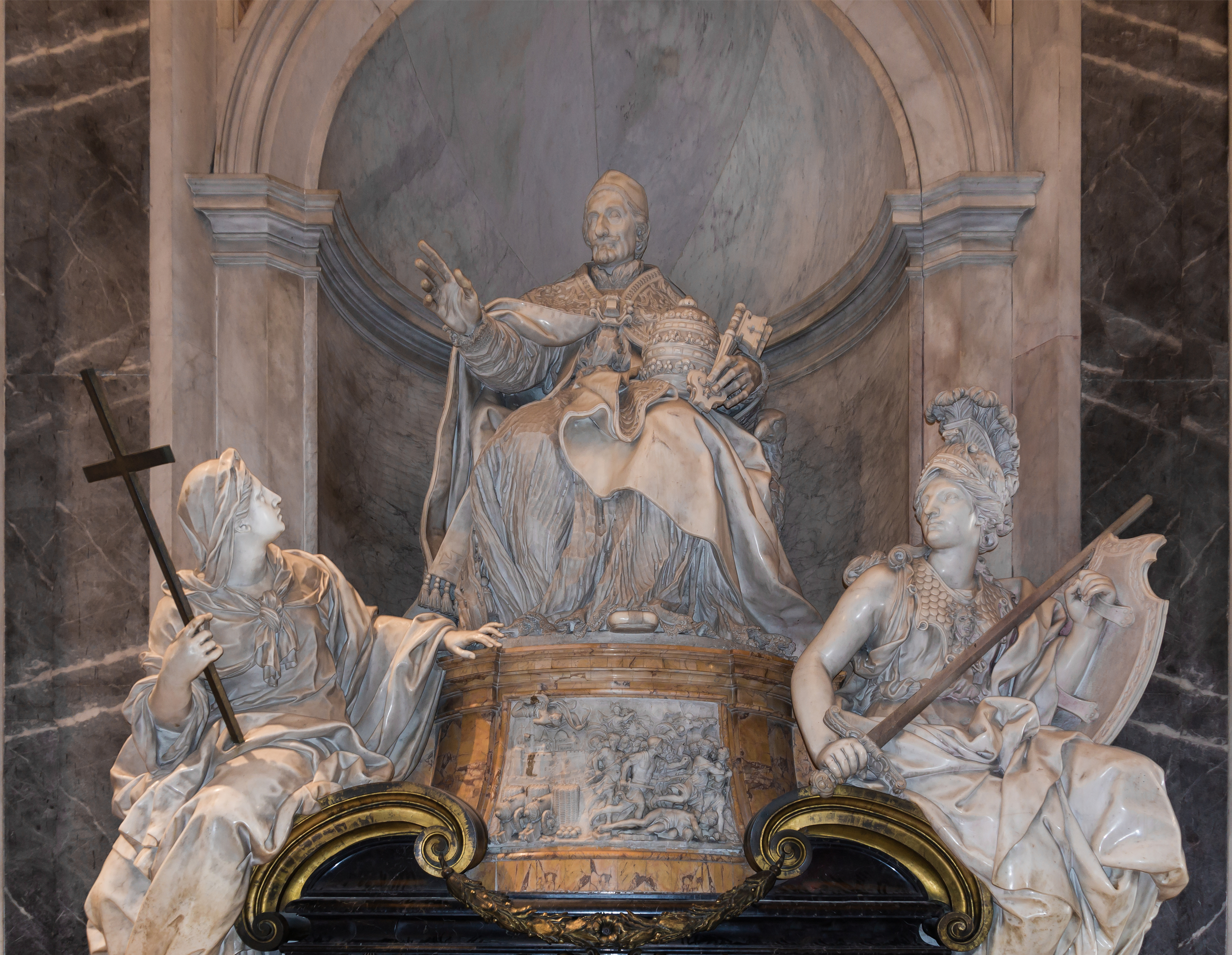
Tomb of Pope Innocent XI, designed by Carlo Maratta, sculpted by Pierre-Étienne Monnot.

He built a magnificent tomb in St. Peter's Basilica in Rome to honor his uncle, who died in 1689, which was finished by 1704. Due to his position as Captain General Livio would also play a significant role during the papal conclave of 1689, which elected Pietro Vito Ottoboni as Pope Alexander VIII.

He also purchased the collection of Christina, Queen of Sweden from her heirs, and used her name to enhance his social standing.

After Sobieski's death in 1696, Odescalchi was one of the candidates in the Polish election of 1697, but Augustus, Elector of Saxony was elected instead. His connection with Poland had predated the Siege of Vienna, as Odescalchi had been the patron of the painter Jerzy Siemiginowski-Eleuter when he was sent to Rome by Sobieski in 1677. When Sobieski's widow, Queen Maria Kazimiera visited Rome in 1699, she stayed at the Palazzo Odescalchi.

Odescalchi died without a direct heir in 1713, and his titles and fortune were inherited by his relative Baldassare Erba-Odescalchi (1683-1746), the grandson of Alessandro Erba (1599-1670) and Lucrezia Odescalchi, the sister of Innocent XI and Carlo Odescalchi.

== See also ==
- Lordship of Ilok and Upper Syrmia
