= Chiari (surname) =

Chiari is a surname. Notable people with the surname include:

- Abdul Chiari (1971–2011), Panamanian football striker
- Fabrizio Chiari (1621–1695), Italian painter and engraver
- Hans Chiari (1851−1916), Austrian pathologist
- Giuseppe Bartolomeo Chiari (1654–1727), Italian painter
- Guido Schmidt-Chiari (1932–2016), Austrian banker
- Isidoro Chiari (1495–1555), one of the fathers of the Council of Trent and a translator of the Bible
- Johann Baptist Chiari (1817–1854), Austrian gynecologist and obstetrician, father of Hans and Ottokar Chiari
- Mario Chiari (1909–1989), Italian production designer and art director
- Nick Chiari (born 1993), American music producer
- Ottokar Chiari (1853–1918), Austrian laryngologist and professor at the University of Vienna
- Pietro Chiari (1712–1785), Italian playwright, novelist and librettist
- Rodolfo Chiari (1869–1937), Panamanian politician
- Walter Chiari (1924–1991), stage name of Italian actor Walter Annichiarico
