= Tomb of the Reliefs =

Etruscan tomb

Coordinates: 42°00′25.5″N 12°06′09.2″E

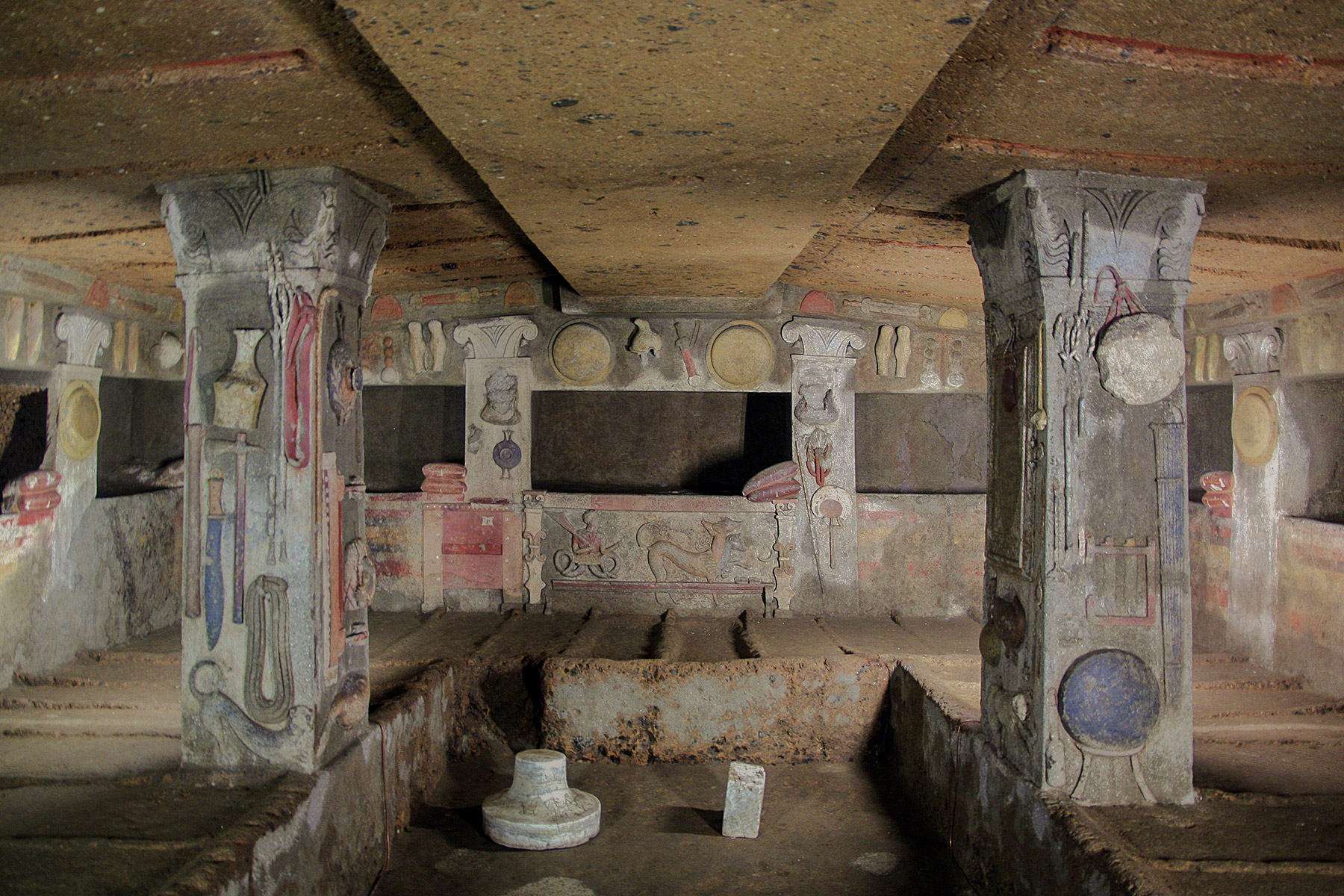
The interior of the tomb

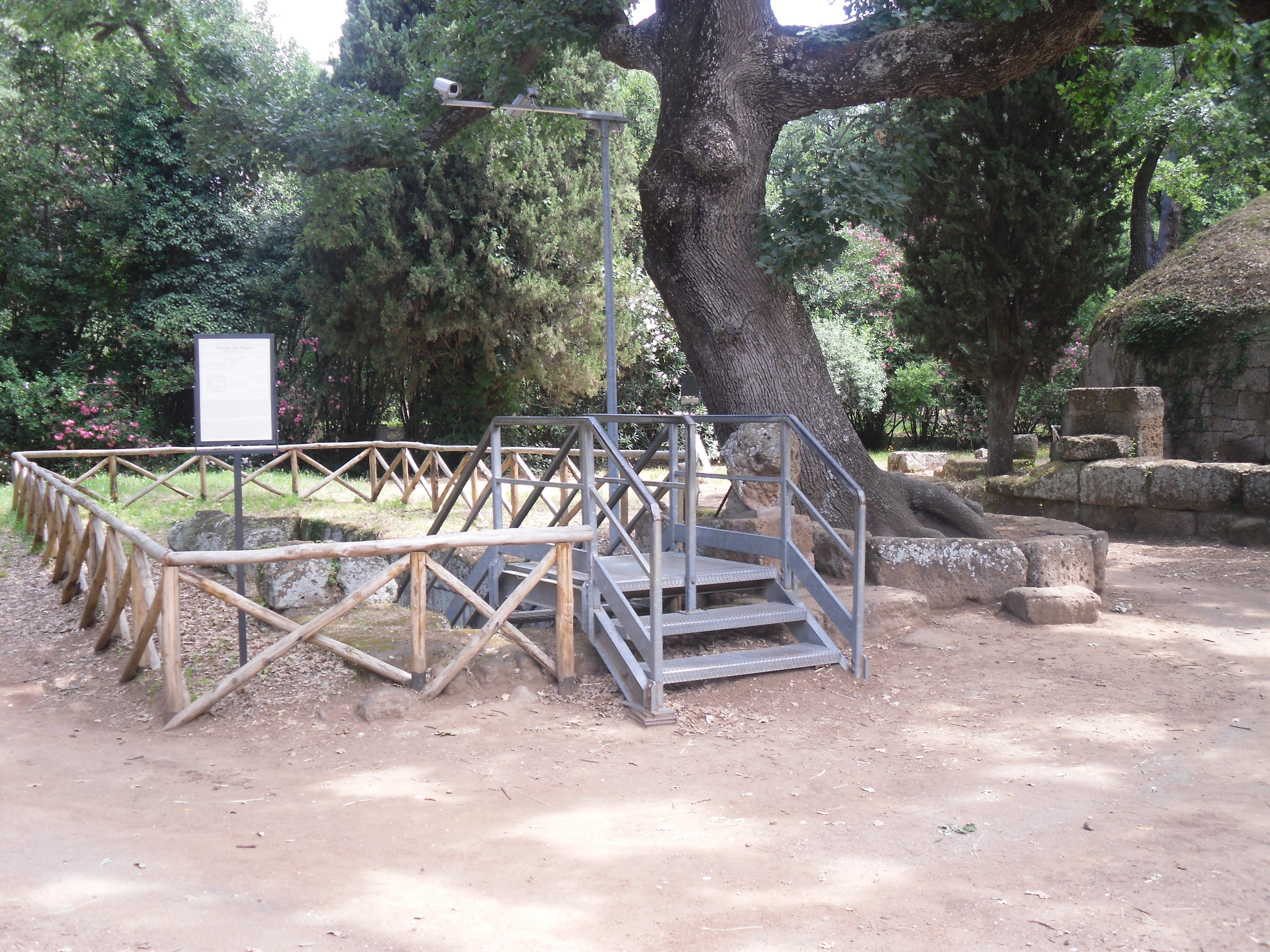
The entrance to the tomb

The Tomb of the Reliefs (Italian: Tomba dei Rilievi) is an Etruscan tomb in the Banditaccia necropolis near Cerveteri, Italy.

It was discovered in 1847 and has been dated to the end of the 4th century BC. It is a unique example of an Etruscan tomb which is decorated with stucco reliefs instead of the usual frescoes.

== Description ==
The tomb belonged to the Matuna family according to inscriptions inside the chamber. The rectangular chamber is entered through a steeply descending stepped dromos. The center of the room is surrounded by a raised platform, which is separated by low ledges into 32 spaces to depose the dead. Above these are 12 oblong niches carved in the walls, which provided space for more deceased. The niches are modeled after beds with stucco pillows. The central niche in the rear wall is deeper, which allowed for a deceased couple to be placed side by side. Below this central niche are reliefs of Kerberos and an unidentified demon from the underworld. The demon has a fish tail and wields a rudder and a serpent. Two damaged busts on the pilasters flanking the central niche possibly depict the divinities Aita and Persipnei.

The walls and the two freestanding pilasters are decorated with stucco reliefs of objects from daily life. These include household items, pets and other animals. Some objects symbolize the Matuna family's power as magistrates, such as an ivory folding chair, horns and a lituus. Their martial prowess is shown by the various helmets, armors, shields and weapons. The decorations give a realistic impression of the interior of Etruscan houses. Because cupboards were not known, everything was hung up on walls. The only piece of furniture is a chest at the foot of the central niche in the rear wall. This might have been used to store valuables. The folded material on top of this chest might depict linen used for writing, such as religious texts or family records.

== Sources ==
- Haynes, Sybille (2000). Etruscan Civilization: A Cultural History. Los Angeles, California: Getty Publications. ISBN 978-0-89236-600-2.
- Steingräber, Stephan (2006). Abundance of Life: Etruscan Wall Painting. Los Angeles, California: Getty Publications. ISBN 978-0-89236-865-5.
