= Kerrie =

Kerrie is a feminine given name. Notable people with the name include:

== Female ==
- Kerrie Biddell (1974–2014), Australian singer
- Kerrie Brown, American set decorator
- Kerrie Cartwright (born 1992), Bahamian tennis player
- Kerrie Engel (born 1966), Australian swimmer
- Kerrie Friend (born 1963), Australian model and presenter
- Kerrie Gosney (born 1975), English weathercaster
- Kerrie Anne Greenland (born 1989), Australian actress and singer
- Kerrie Hayes (born 1986), English actress
- Kerrie Hughes (born 1959), New Zealand fashion designer
- Kerrie Keane (born 1948), Canadian actress
- Kerrie Lester (1953–2016), Australian artist
- Kerrie Manley (born 1982), Welsh former footballer
- Kerrie Mather (born 1948), Australian chief executive
- Kerrie McCarthy (born 2000), Ghanaian association footballer
- Kerrie Meares (born 1982), Australian cyclist
- Kerrie Mengersen (born 1962), Australian statistician
- Kerrie Poliness (born 1962), Australian artist
- Kerrie Roberts (born 1985), American artist
- Kerrie Taurima (born 1979), Australian long jumper
- Kerrie Taylor (born 1973), British actress
- Kerrie Tucker (born 1948), Australian politician
- Kerrie Wilson, Australian environment scientist
- Kerrie-Ann Craddock (born 1984), Irish rugby union player

== Male ==
- Kerrie Holley (born 1954), American computer scientist and software engineer
- Kerrie Symmonds (born 1966), Barbadian lawyer and politician

== Other uses ==
- Kerrie, Victoria, town in Victoria, Australia

== See also ==
- Keri (disambiguation)
- Kerry (disambiguation)
