= Luciano Ceri =

Italian composer

- Born: March 25, 1951 (age 75); Mogadishu, Italian Somaliland
- Occupations: Singer, songwriter, journalist and radio host
- Years active: 1975–present

Luciano Ceri (born 25 March 1951) is an Italian singer-songwriter, journalist and radio host.

== Early life ==
Ceri was born in 1951 to Italian parents in Mogadishu. The city was at the time the capital of Italian Somaliland. Ceri later moved to Italy to begin his music career.

== Career ==
Ceri originally started off by playing in beat bands; then proceeded to play in the 70's the group of progressive rock, Big Fall. During the band's three years they recorded two albums for EMI Italian. The group would later dissolve after only three years after forming. Ceri would then later go on to work as a songwriter, performing often at Folkstudio and it is precisely with the label of Giancarlo Cesaroni, the owner of the premises, which publishes his solo album in 1987.

Ceri has published several books such as the World Beat Music, with Ernesto De Pascale (Out of Thema, 1993), and Thoughts and Words, Lucio Battisti. An annotated discography (Tarab, 1996), reprinted in 2008 by publisher Rabbit. It is part of the jury of the Premio Ciampi and is the project manager of the National Italian Song Lyrics of Disco State - Audiovisual Museum. The 2008 one is one of the main collaborators of the magazine Easy Listening.
