= Cerveteri =

- Comune
- Comune di Cerveteri
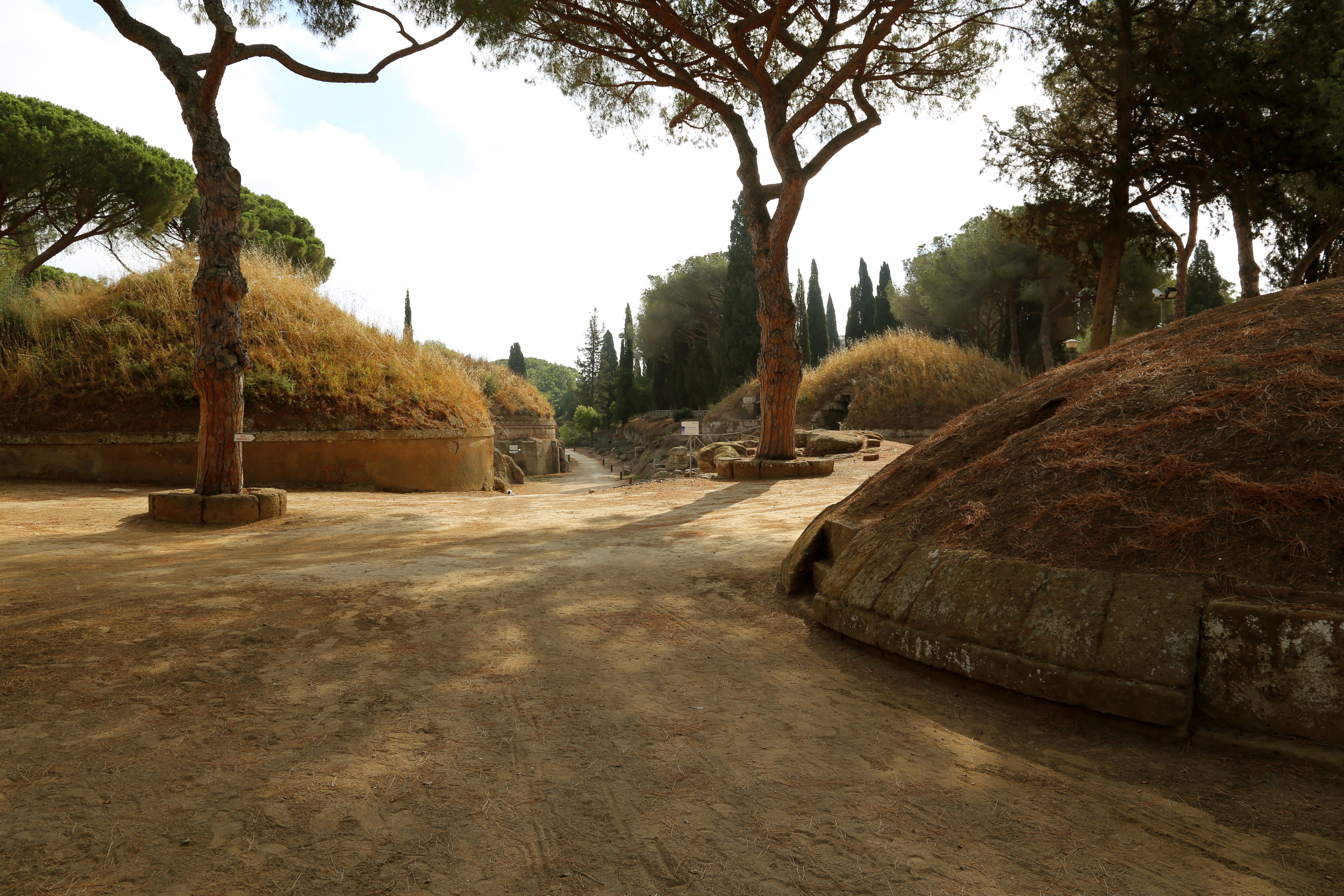
- Banditaccia Necropolis

- Location within Italy Location within Lazio
- Coordinates: 42°00′27″N 12°06′18″E
- Country: Italy
- Region: Lazio
- Metropolitan city: Rome
- Frazioni: Ceri, Due Casette, Furbara, Borgo San Martino, Sasso, Valcanneto, Casetta Mattei, Cerqueto, Quartaccio, Cerenova, Campo di Mare, I Terzi, San Paolo, Gricciano, Pian della Carlotta, Zambra

Government
  - Mayor: Elena Gubetti

Area
  - Total: 134.32 km^{2} (51.86 sq mi)
- Elevation: 81 m (266 ft)

Population (30 November 2017)
  - Total: 37,983
  - Density: 282.78/km^{2} (732.40/sq mi)
- Time zone: UTC+1 (CET)
  - Summer (DST): UTC+2 (CEST)
- Website: Official website

UNESCO World Heritage Site
- Official name: Cerveteri, Etruscan Necropolis of Banditaccia
- Part of: Etruscan Necropolises of Cerveteri and Tarquinia
- Criteria: Cultural: (i)(iii)(iv)
- Reference: 1158
- Inscription: 2004 (28th Session)
- Area: 197.57 ha (488.2 acres)
- Buffer zone: 1,824.04 ha (4,507.3 acres)

Cerveteri (Italian: [tʃerˈvɛːteri]) is a comune (municipality) in the Metropolitan City of Rome Capital, in the Italian region of Lazio. Known by the ancient Romans as Caere, and previously by the Etruscans as Caisra or Cisra, and as Agylla (or Άγυλλα) by the Greeks, its modern name derives from Caere Vetus (more precisely its locative Caere Veterī) used in the 13th century to distinguish it from Caere Novum (the current town).

It is the site of an ancient Etruscan city, one of the most important Etruscan cities, with an area more than 15 times larger than today's town. The best-known structures on the site form the Banditaccia Necropolis, and comprises all of the most important tumulus tombs and chambers known. Cut out of tufa, most of the tombs echo Greek architecture.

Caere was one of the city-states of the Etruscan League and at its height, around 600 BC, its population was perhaps around 25,000 – 40,000 people.

== Site ==
The ancient city was situated about 7 km (4.3 mi) from the sea, a location that made it a wealthy trading town derived originally from the iron-ore mines in the Tolfa Hills.

It had three sea ports including Pyrgi, connected to Caere by a road about 13 km (8.1 mi) long and 10 m (33 ft) wide, and Punicum.

Pyrgi was also known for its sanctuary of monumental temples from 510 BC, built by the king of Caere and dedicated to the goddesses Leucothea and Ilithyia, of whom several sculptures are exhibited at the Villa Giulia.

== Monuments ==
Little is known of the ancient city, although six temples are known from various sources. Two of them have been excavated, one of Hera, the other in the north of the city. Parts of the city walls are still visible today and excavations opened up a theatre. Three necropoleis were found. The contents of the tombs were excavated, often chaotically and illegally; over the last few centuries they have yielded rich and exquisite objects, including ceramics and jewellery that today grace many of the world's museums. One famous and important work of art is the Sarcophagus of the Spouses.

=== Necropolis of the Banditaccia ===
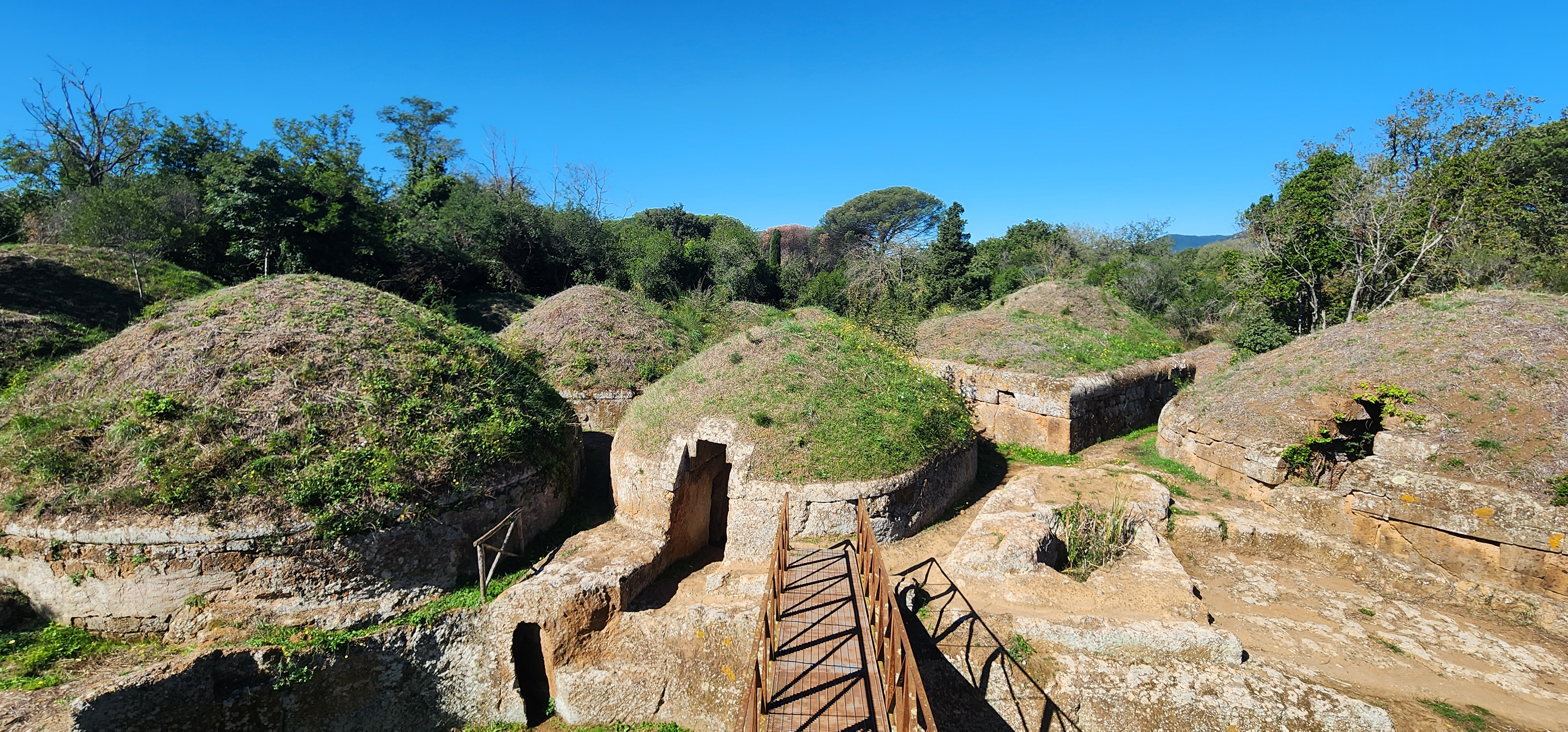
View of the necropolis.

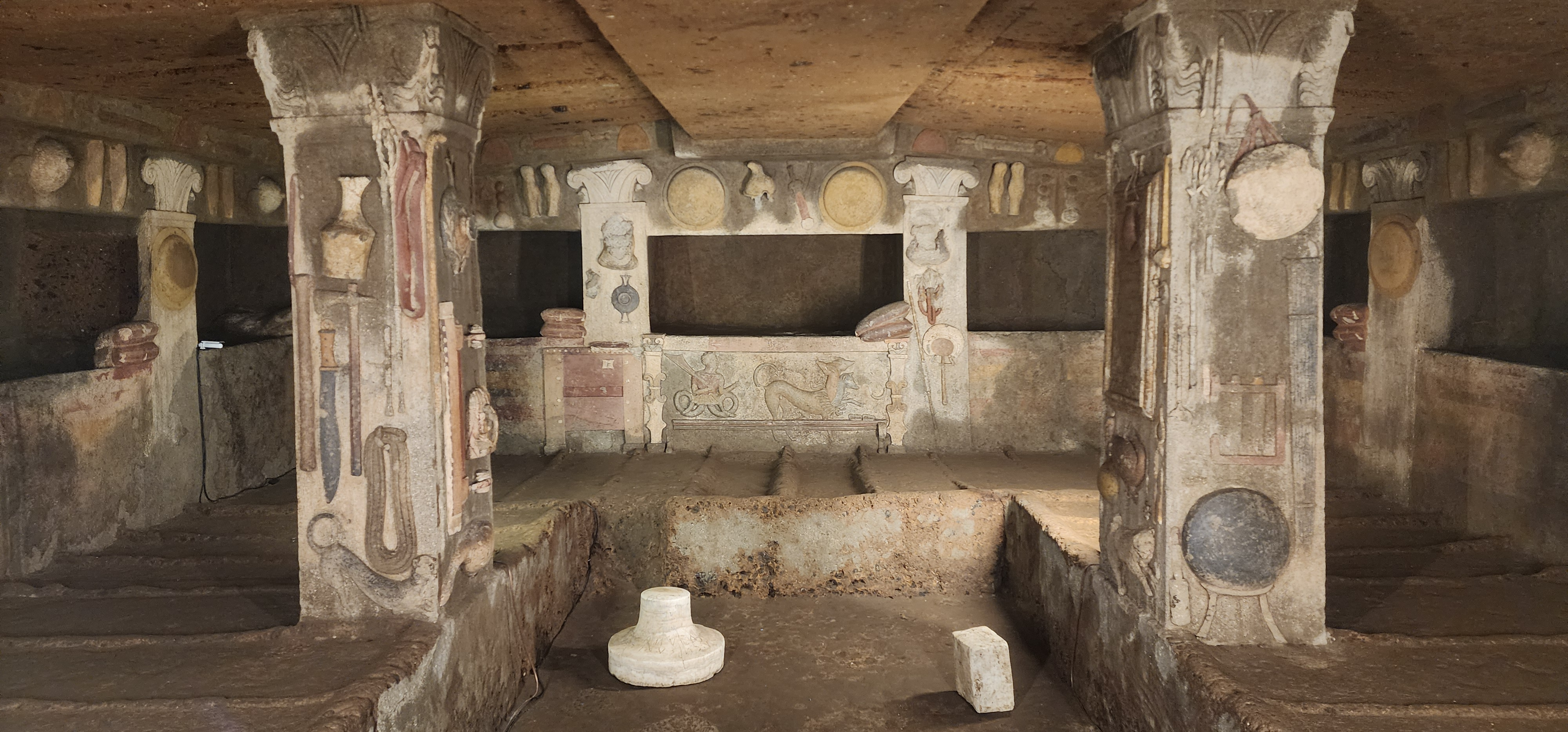
Tomb of the reliefs, 4th century B.C., belonging to the Matuna family. Note the red pillows.

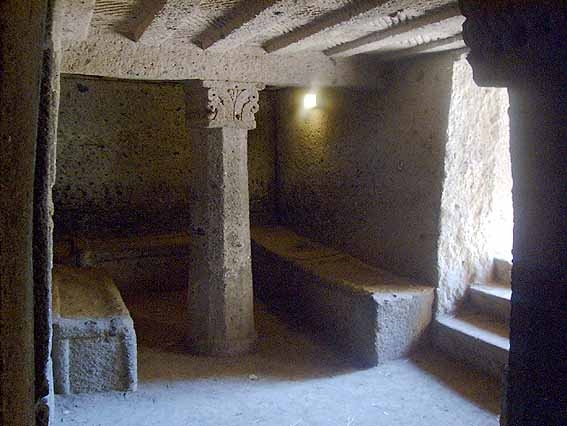
Interior of an Etruscan tomb in the Banditaccia necropolis

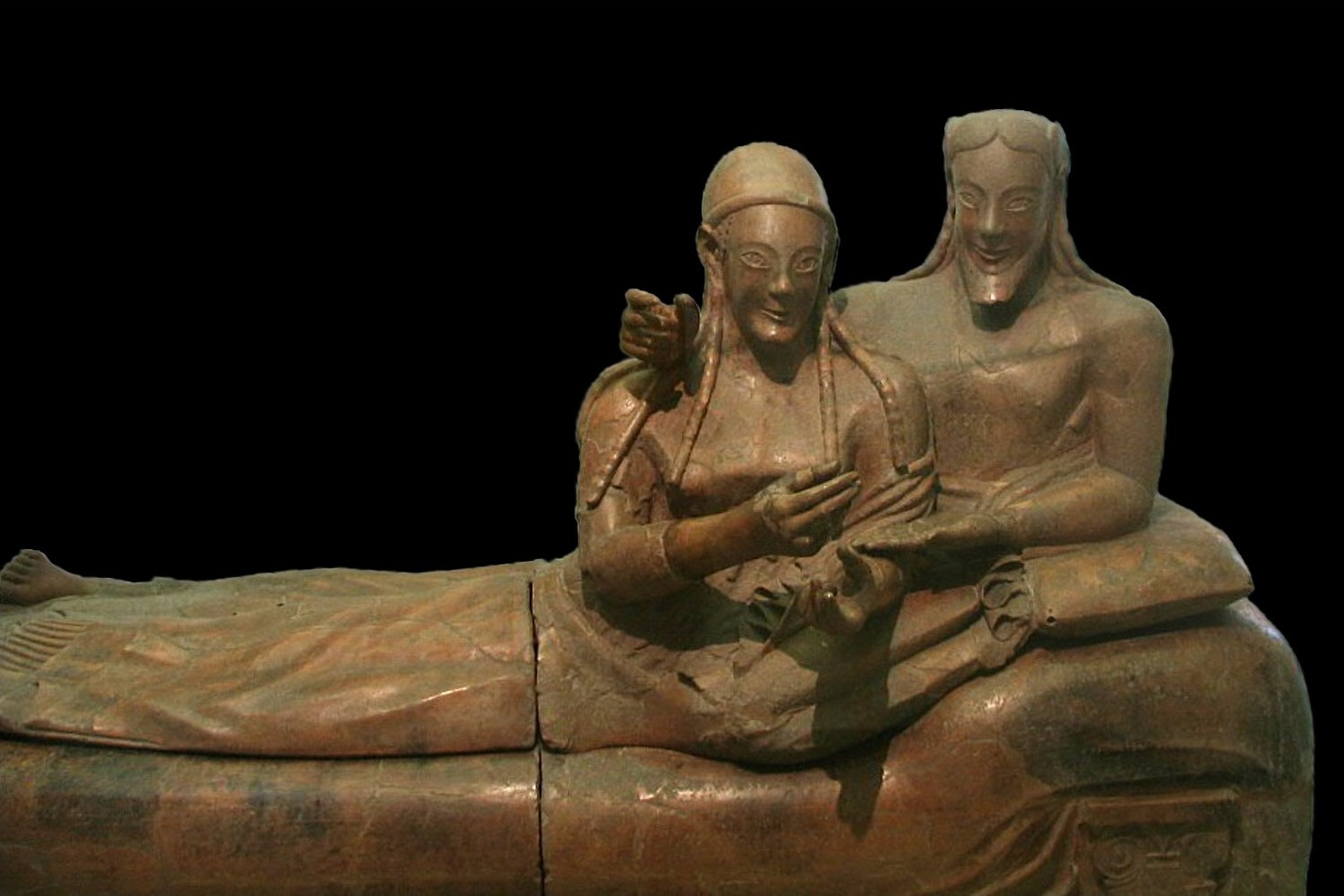
Sarcophagus of the Spouses (Villa Giulia)

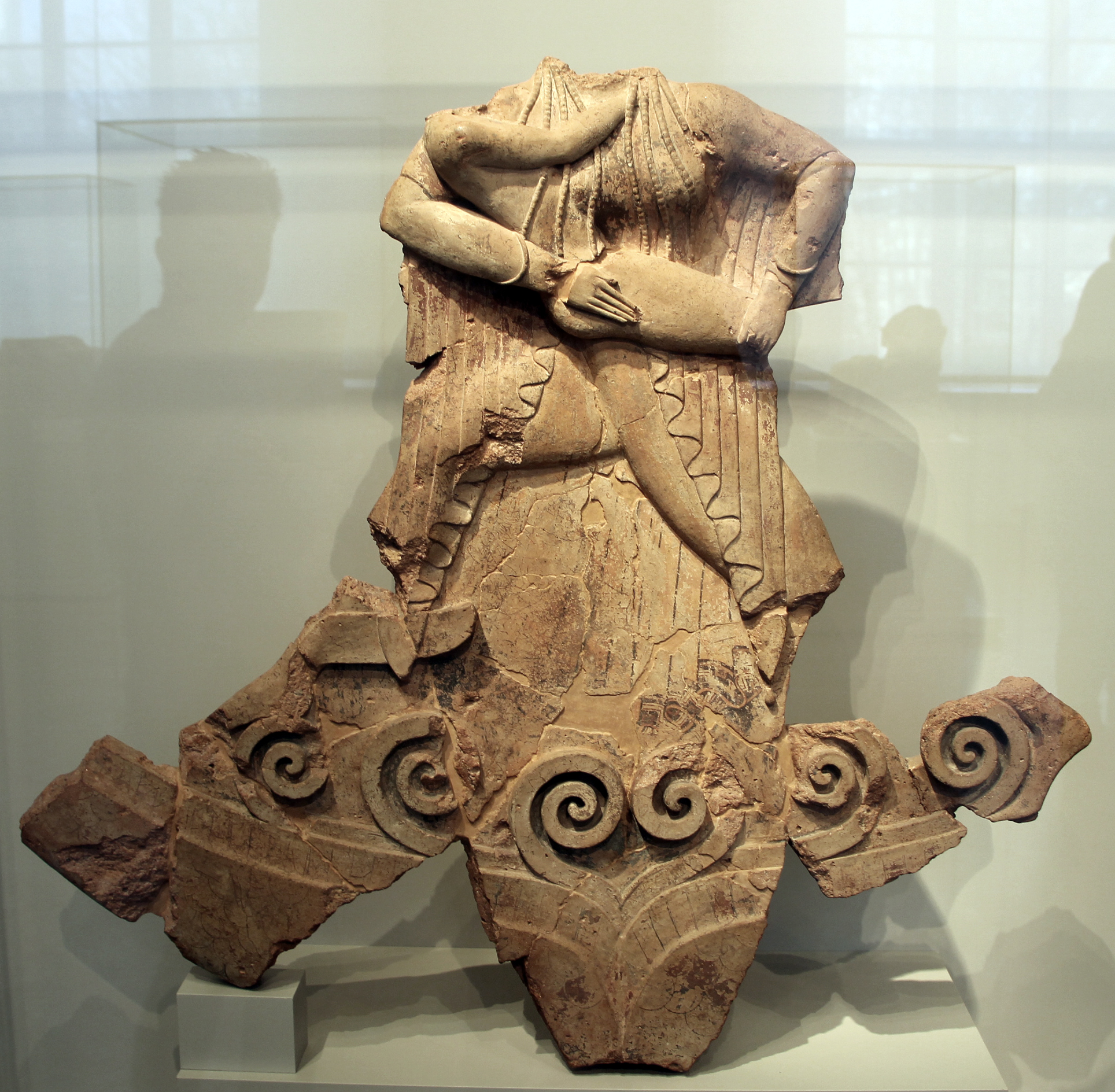
Sculpture from a temple at Caere, 525–500 BC (Altes Museum Berlin)

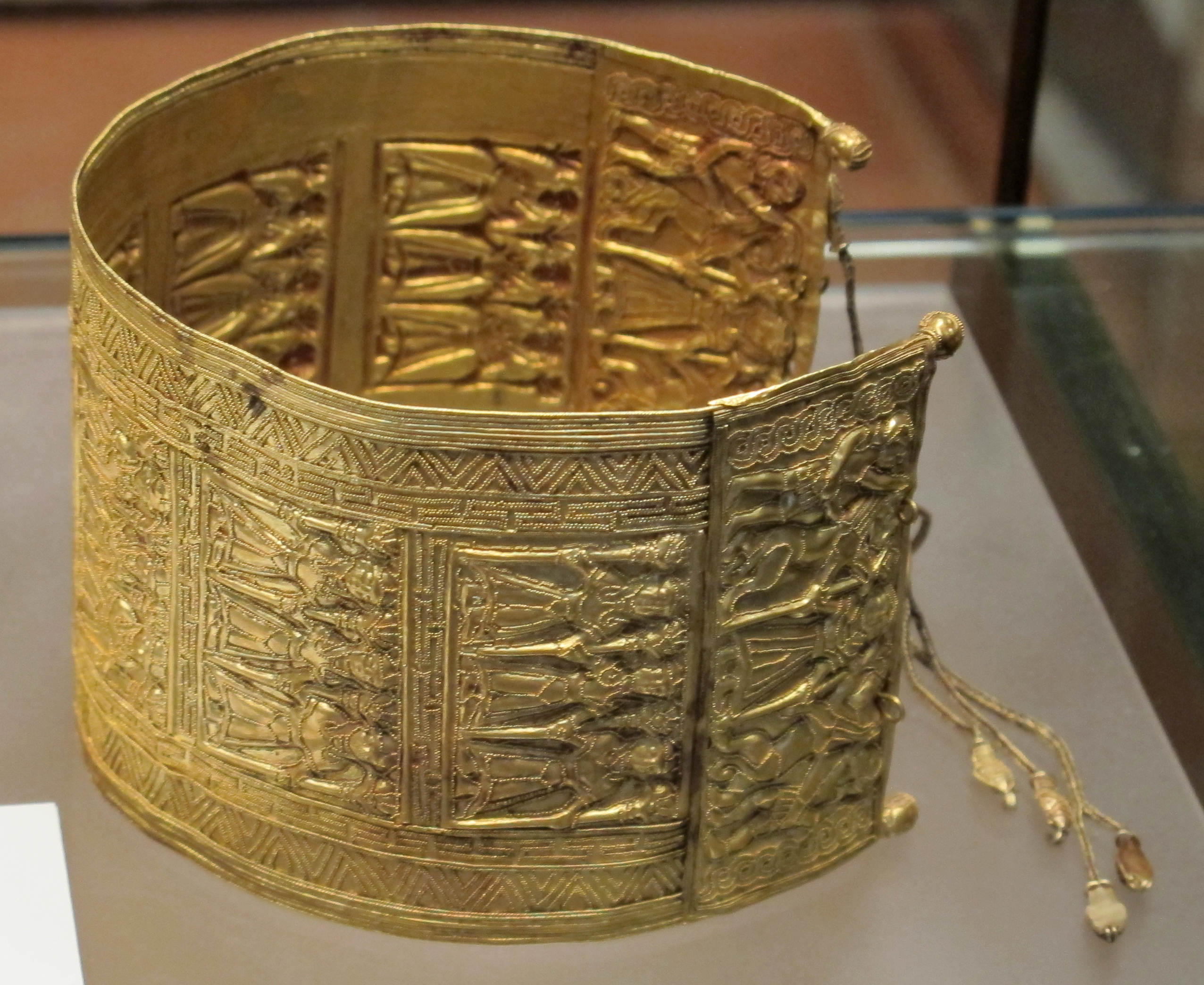
Gold bracelet from the tomb Regolini-Galassi, c. 650 BC

The most famous attraction of Cerveteri is the Etruscan Necropoli della Banditaccia, which has been declared by UNESCO as a World Heritage Site together with the necropolis in Tarquinia. It covers an area of 400 hectares (990 acres), of which 10 hectares (25 acres) can be visited, encompassing a total of about 1,000 tombs often housed in characteristic mounds. It is the largest ancient necropolis in the Mediterranean area. The name Banditaccia comes from the leasing (bando) of areas of land to the Cerveteri population by the local landowners.

The tombs date from the 9th century BC (Villanovan culture) to the later Etruscan period (third century BC). The earliest tombs are in the shape of a pit, in which the ashes of the dead were housed; simple potholes are also present.

The most important tombs include:

- Tomb Regolini-Galassi with rich gold finds from the mid-7th century BC
- Tomb of the capitals (Tomba dei Capitelli), middle 6th century BC
- Tomb of the shields and chairs (Tomba degli Scudi e delle Sedie), middle 6th century BC
- Tomb of the Painted Lions (Tomba dei Leoni dipinti), 620 BC
- Tomb of the Reliefs (Tomba dei Rilievi), 4th – 2nd century BC
- Tomb of the Sea Waves (Tomba delle Onde Marine), 4th–3rd century BC
- Tomb of the Alcove (Tomba dell'Alcova), 4th – 3rd century BC
- Tomba della capanna
- Tomba dei Vasi Greci
- Tomba dei Doli
- Tomba calabresi

From the later Etruscan period are two types of tombs: tumulus-type tombs and the so-called "dice", the latter being simple square tombs built in long rows along roads within the necropolis. The visitable area contains two such roads, the Via dei Monti Ceriti and the Via dei Monti della Tolfa (6th century BC).

The tumuli are circular structures built in tuff, and the interiors, carved from the living rock, house a reconstruction of the house of the dead, including a corridor (dromos), a central hall and several rooms. Modern knowledge of Etruscan daily life is largely dependent on the numerous decorative details and finds from such tombs. One of the most famous tombs is the Tomb of the Reliefs, identified from an inscription as belonging to the Matuna family and provided with an exceptional series of frescoes, bas-reliefs and sculptures portraying a large series of contemporary life tools.

The most recent tombs date from the 3rd century BC. Some of them are marked by external cippi, which are cylindrical for men and in the shape of a small house for women.

A large number of finds excavated at Cerveteri are in the National Etruscan Museum, Rome, with others in the Vatican Museums and many other museums around the world. Others, mainly pottery, are in the Archaeological Museum at Cerveteri itself.

=== Other monuments ===
- The Rocca ("castle")
- Church of Santa Maria Maggiore, including a medieval section reachable from the 1950s addition through a triumphal arch
- Palazzo Ruspoli, rebuilt as baronial palace by the Orsini in 1533. This now houses the city's museum, the Museo nazionale cerite, with important Etruscan collections, including the Euphronios Krater, returned by the Metropolitan Museum of Art in New York. The portico and the loggia on the façade are from the 17th century. It is connected to Santa Maria Maggiore through a passetto (enclosed bridge), built in 1760.
- The small church of Sant'Antonio Abate, with a 1472 fresco by Lorenzo da Viterbo
- The medieval burgh of Ceri
- Castle of Cerenova

== Cerveteri DOC ==
Around the city of Cerveteri is an Italian DOC wine region that produces red and white blended wines. The red wines are blends of 60% Sangiovese and Montepulciano, 25% Cesanese and up to 30% of Canaiolo, Carignan and Barbera. The grapes are limited to a harvest yield of 15 tonnes/ha and the final wine must have a minimum alcohol level of 11%. The white wines are composed of a minimum blend of 50% Trebbiano Romagnolo and Giallo, a maximum of 35% Malvasia di Candia and a maximum of 15% Friulano, Verdicchio, Bellone and Bombino bianco. The grapes are limited to a harvest yield of 14 tonnes/ha and the final wine must have a minimum alcohol level of 12%.

== Ancient bishopric ==
For the ancient bishopric that originally had its seat in Cerveteri and is now a titular see (see Caere).

== Twin cities ==
- Fürstenfeldbruck, Germany
- Livry-Gargan, France
- Almuñécar, Spain
- Lankaran, Azerbaijan
