= Il Popolo del Blues =

Il Popolo del Blues logo

Il Popolo del Blues is an Italian radio program founded in 1995, created and led by the Italian journalist Ernesto De Pascale (RAI, Jam, La Nazione, Rolling Stone Italia, Record Collector, Popolare Network), named by the BBC “the Italian John Peel”. The radio show is broadcast every Saturday 8 p.m. on Controradio (in Tuscany, Italy) and every Sunday 9 p.m. on Popolare Network (nationwide).

== History ==
The radio program was founded after the never ending requests by the listeners of Rai Stereonotte, the most important Italian radio show dedicated to high quality music during the 1980s and the 1990s. Since the beginning the show was dedicated to the preservation and diffusion of contemporary forms of blues. After a few years the activity of the brand has grown into a versatile body of activities that involve its founder. Il Popolo del Blues' radio engineer since the beginning is Fabrizio Berti, one of the most important musicologist and harp player from Pistoia, Tuscany.

== The website and the record label ==
Il Popolo del Blues' website, Ilpoplodelblues online, was launched in 1998 and in 2001 it became a music web magazine (registered at the Italian Register of Communications) updated monthly with news, reviews and interviews and counting around 2000 visitors every day. Il Popolo del Blues is also an independent record label and its catalogue includes a number of albums and releases such as Morning Manic Music, one of the label’s latest releases and Ernesto De Pascale's first solo album.

== Il Popolo del Blues record label's catalogue ==
- Il nuovo Blues in Italia, vol 1 (Sony, 1995)
- Il nuovo Blues in Italia, vol 2 (Sony, 1996)
- Il nuovo Blues in Italia, vol 3 (Sony, 1997)
- Il Nuovo Blues in Italia, vol 4 (Sony, 1998) - never released
- AAVV -2120 Michigan Avenue - Chicago, Italia vol. 1 (1998) (PDB/Il Manifesto)
- Egidio Juke Ingala - Nite Life Boogie ( PDB 1999 01 - 2)
- Chicago Blue Revue - Chicago Blue revue (PDB 1999 02 -2)
- AAVV -2120 Michigan Avenue - Chicago, Italia vol. 2 (1999) (PDB/Il Manifesto)
- AAVV - Frank you thank vol.1 (PDB 1999 005 -2 /Il Manifesto)
- Dennis & the Jets - Passami la Scossa ( PDB 1999 06 - 2 )
- Dario Lombardo e Phil Guy - Working Together (PDB 1999 07 - 2/MaterialI Sonori)
- Home Cookin' - Afrobilly Soul Stew (PDB 2000 008 - 2/Materiali Sonori)
- Garybaldi feat. Bambi Fossati - La ragione e il torto (PDB 2000 09 -2/Materiali Sonori)
- AAVV - Songs For Jethro (PDB 2000 010 -2/MaterialI Sonori )
- Angelo "Leadbelly" Rossi - Jump up songs (PDB 2000 011 - 2/Materiali Sonori)
- Oliver Nelson: composer & arranger, a tribute (PDB 2002 012 - 2/Materiali Sonori)
- AAVV - Frank you thank vol. 2 (PDB 2002 013 - 2/Il Manifesto)
- Dario Lombardo & the Blues Gang - Searchin' For gold ( PDB 2003 014 - 2/Materiali Sonori)
- Ernesto De Pascale - Morning Manic Music (PDB 2007 015 - 2/Materiali Sonori)
- Gina - Segreto ( PDB 2009 016 - 2/Materiali Sonori)

== Latest developments, recent years ==
Since 2004 Il Popolo del Blues radio program is broadcast nationwide. Since 2008 it is available on podcast on Controradio's website . Saturday show is currently rebroadcast in Tuscany on Sunday 5.30 p.m. And on Tuesday 00.30 a.m. Il Popolo del Blues lately became also a brand operating in the communications, promotions and marketing sectors with a strong emphasis on music and cultivated entertainment. It takes care of the promotion of artists, festivals, record releases and events and it is currently marketing the UK label Esoteric Recordings and Loose Music, promoting Tony Banks' 1979 A Curious Feeling reissue, marketing events like Porretta Soul Festival and Premio Ciampi in Italy, Piazza Blues Festival in Bellinzona, Switzerland.
