= Chieri (disambiguation) =

Chieri is a town and comune in Piedmont, Italy.

Chieri may also refer to:

- Chieri Calcio, an Italian association football club, based in Chieri
- Chieri '76 Volleyball, an Italian women's volleyball club based in Chieri
- Chieri, a fictional Darkover race
- Chieri Sono, a fictional character of AKB0048
- Primarosa Chieri, an Argentine geneticist and physician

== See also ==
- Ceri (disambiguation)
- Cheri (disambiguation)
- Chiari (disambiguation)
