= Guido Schmidt-Chiari =

Austrian banker (1932–2016)

Guido Schmidt-Chiari (13 September 1932 – 21 August 2016) was an Austrian banker. He was the CEO of the Austrian bank Creditanstalt. Schmidt-Chiari was born in Vienna, Austria, the eldest child of Guido Schmidt. He married Countess Stephanie Strachwitz in 1974, with whom he has six children. Stephanie Schmidt-Chiari is a direct cousin of the American music producer Chris Strachwitz.

== Biography ==
In 1952 Guido Schmidt-Chiari moved to Brazil to work for a subsidiary of Alpine-Mountain in Rio de Janeiro and in 1953 set up the São Paulo distribution branch for Jenbacher Werke products. He returned to Austria and in 1956 received his PhD in law from the University of Vienna. In 1957 Guido Schmidt-Chiari worked for the Belgian-American Banking Corporation in New York City. In 1958 he began work at Creditanstalt in Vienna, in 1971 he was appointed to the Executive Board and further promoted to CEO in 1988. After the Fall of the Iron Curtain Schmidt-Chiari initiated the expansion of Creditanstalt into Central European countries. Following the acquisition of Creditanstalt by Bank Austria Schmidt-Chiari resigned in 1997.

Under the direction of Guido Schmidt-Chiari, the Creditanstalt Group grew manifold and saw net profit after tax grow from 1.2 billion ATS in 1991 to 5.8 billion ATS in 1997, an increase in return on equity from 6% to 19.2%, making Creditanstalt by far the most profitable bank in Austria at the time.

The Schmidt-Chiari family have a large equity stake in two family businesses: Joseph Schmidt's Erben (founded in 1887) an industrial distribution company and the Arlberger Bergbahnen AG (founded in 1937), a ski lift operator with resorts in Austria and Poland. The main lift business operates the world-renowned ski resort of St. Anton am Arlberg

Schmidt-Chiari has also chaired the supervisory board of several leading Austrian companies (inter alia: Wienerberger AG, Semperit AG, Steyr-Daimler-Puch AG and Andritz AG) and held a wide variety of other posts including being on the Morgan Stanley European Advisory Board and the General Council of Assicurazioni Generali, Trieste. He was the president of the Austrian Bankers Association and founded the Austrian Delegation to the Trilateral Commission.

Aside from his involvement in the financial world, Guido Schmidt-Chiari and his wife, Stephanie enjoy collecting turn-of-the-century Viennese Jugendstil, with a focus on those by the architect and designer Josef Hofmann and his contemporaries. Stephanie Schmidt-Chiari is a member of the International Council of the Museum of Modern Art, New York (MoMA) and Guido Schmidt-Chiari is an Advisory Board Member of Mumok, Vienna as well as on the board of directors of the Wiener Konzerthaus, Vienna.

Schmidt-Chiari died in Sankt Anton am Arlberg, Austria, on 21 August 2016.

== Decorations ==
Among other decorations Guido Schmidt-Chiari has been appointed an Honorary Senator of the Business University of Vienna and an Honorary Senator of the Technical University of Vienna as well as Officier de la Legion d'Honneur.
