= Mehro Pilo =

Coordinates: 33°03′N 72°43′E

Mehro Peelo, is a historical village of the Chakwal District, in Punjab, Pakistan, named after Baba Peelo, a famous poet hailing from Punjab. This village is also known as Sardar Harrar khan. The Mughal Kassar tribe constitutes the bulk of the village's population. Especially in the Mehro sub-tribe of Kasar, known as Churhial, a name given by CH Chourh Khan, a major landowner in Mehro. The Kasar Family directly belongs to Sardar Kassar Khan, a son of Amir Taimur Lang (Mongol Turk Emperor). In Peelo, the majority of people belong to the Qutab Shai Awan Family. Mehro Peelo includes watts in the union council Thaneel Kamal.

Mehro Peelo village is located about 22 kilometres (14 mi) from Chakwal city at Neela Dullah Road.
