= List of storms named Kerry =

The name Kerry, has been used for four tropical cyclones worldwide: one in the Australian Region and three in the South Pacific Ocean.

In the Australian Region:

- Cyclone Kerry (1973) – a Category 4 severe tropical cyclone that made landfall Western Australia.

In the South Pacific Ocean:

- Cyclone Kerry (1979) – a Category 4 severe tropical cyclone that affected Solomon Islands and Queensland.
- Cyclone Kerry (1989) – remained away from ocean.
- Cyclone Kerry (2005) – a Category 3 severe tropical cyclone that affected Vanuatu.
