= Cerenova =

Marina di Cerveteri Cerenova
- Frazione
- Location of Marina di Cerveteri in Italy
- Coordinates: 42°00′N 12°06′E
- Country: Italy
- Region: Lazio
- Province: Rome
- Comune: Cerveteri

Population (21 October 2001)
  - Total: 7,957
- Time zone: UTC+1 (CET)
  - Summer (DST): UTC+2 (CEST)
- Postal code: 00052
- Dialing code: 06
- Website: Official website

Cerenova is a coastal locality that along with the adjacent Campo di Mare makes up the Marina di Cerveteri frazione of the comune of Cerveteri. It is located on the via Aurelia around 40 km north of Rome (Italy). Cerenova borders Ladispoli to the South, Furbara (another frazione of Cerveteri) to the north and the Tyrrhenian Sea to the west.

The term Cerenova is often used as a collective name for the entire frazione instead of the more formal Marina di Cerveteri.

== History ==
Initially developed as a holiday location in the 1960s on land owned by the Ruspoli family, its first inhabitants were mainly families from Rome. As the village grew, its administration passed from the building consortium to the comune of Cerveteri.

Over the years, Cerenova has seen the installation of all essential services: schools (nursery, primary and secondary), post office, Carabinieri station and many commercial units. Cerenova and Campo di Mare are still being expanded, and the overall population is increasing constantly, especially as properties in Rome are becoming less affordable.

== Churches ==
- Chiesa della Madonna del piano (not in use), where the Ruspoli family graves are located
- Chiesa di San Francesco d'Assisi, built in 1975 in the modern style

== Infrastructure and transport ==
Cerenova is located next to the via Aurelia highway. Its nearest motorway is the Autostrada A12 Rome - Civitavecchia, reached via the Cerveteri-Ladispoli exit.

The closest airports are Fiumicino (40 km) and Ciampino (60 km). For maritime links, Civitavecchia is the closest major port and is located 40 km north.

A small train station is located between Campo di Mare and Cerenova, on the Rome-Pisa route.
