= Siôn Ceri =

Welsh poet

Siôn Ceri (fl. early 16th Century) was a Welsh language poet. His bardic teacher was Tudur Aled and among his surviving work are poems to his patrons from north Powys.

== Bibliography ==
- A. Cynfael Lake (ed.), Gwaith Siôn Ceri (Aberystwyth, 1996). The standard edition of his poems, in Welsh.
