= Korea Electrotechnology Research Institute =

South Korean research institute

- 한국전기연구원
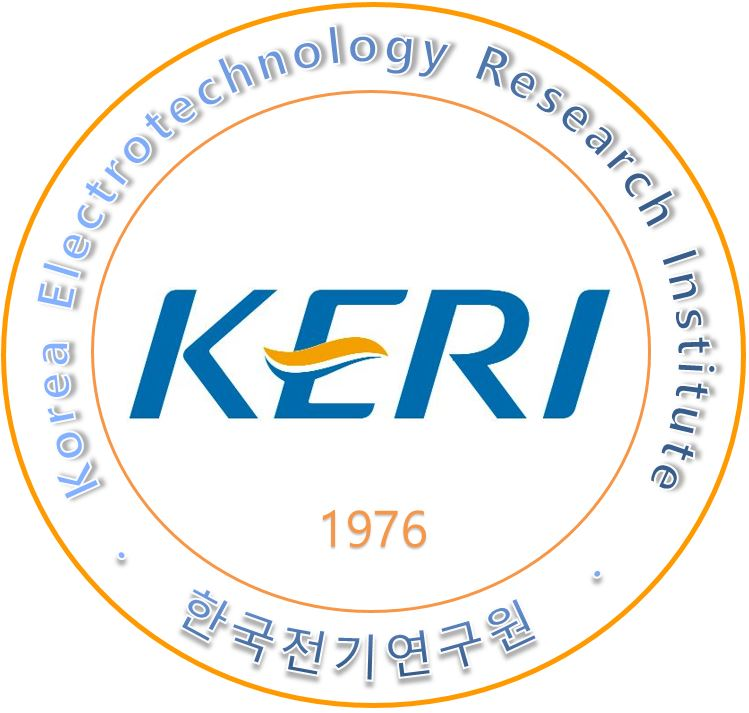
- Formation: December 29, 1976
- Headquarters: Gyeongsangnam-do, South Korea
- Location: 12 Jeongiui-gil, Seongsan-gu, Changwon, Gyeongsangnam-do, South Korea
- Coordinates: 35.1898917°N 128.718154°E
- President: Kim Nam-kyun
- Staff: 530 (2008)
- Website: www.keri.re.kr/html/en

- Korea Electrotechnology Research Institute
- Hangul: 한국전기연구원
- Hanja: 韓國電氣硏究院
- RR: Hanguk jeongi yeonguwon
- MR: Han'guk chŏn'gi yŏn'guwŏn

The Korea Electrotechnology Research Institute (KERI, Korean: 한국전기연구원) is a non-profit government-funded research institute in Republic of Korea. Established in 1976, KERI contributes to research on electrotechnology and testing of power apparatus. The main office is in Changwon, Republic of Korea and two branches are in Ansan and Uiwang, Gyeonggi-do, Korea. As of 2008, KERI has about 530 employees including 300 researchers.

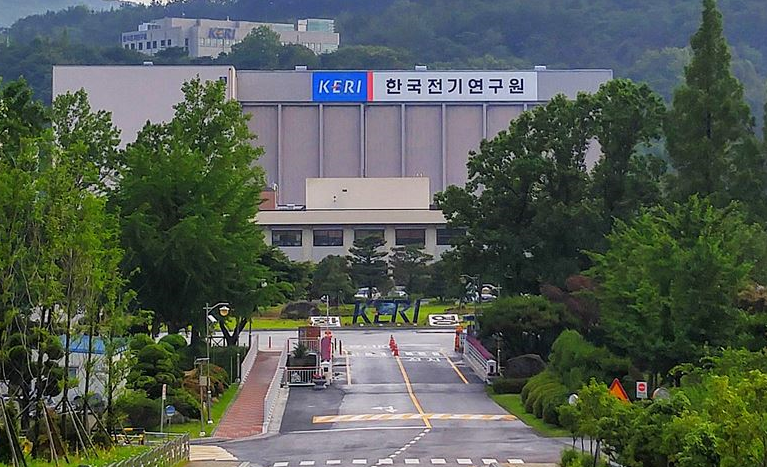
KERI

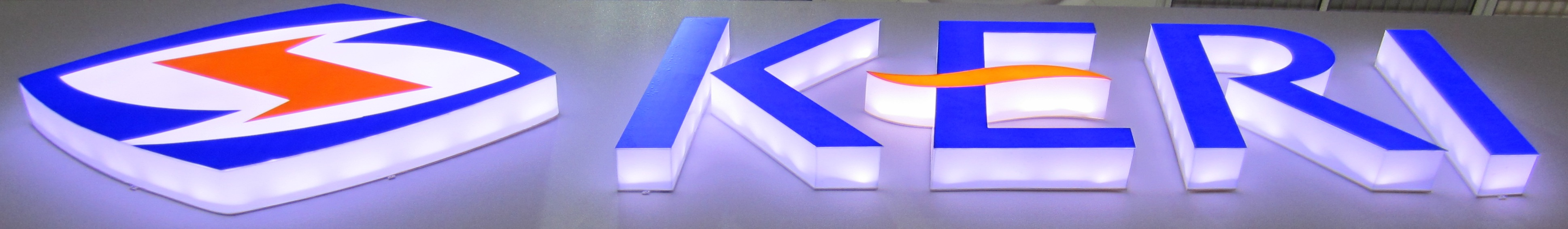
KERI logo at KIMES

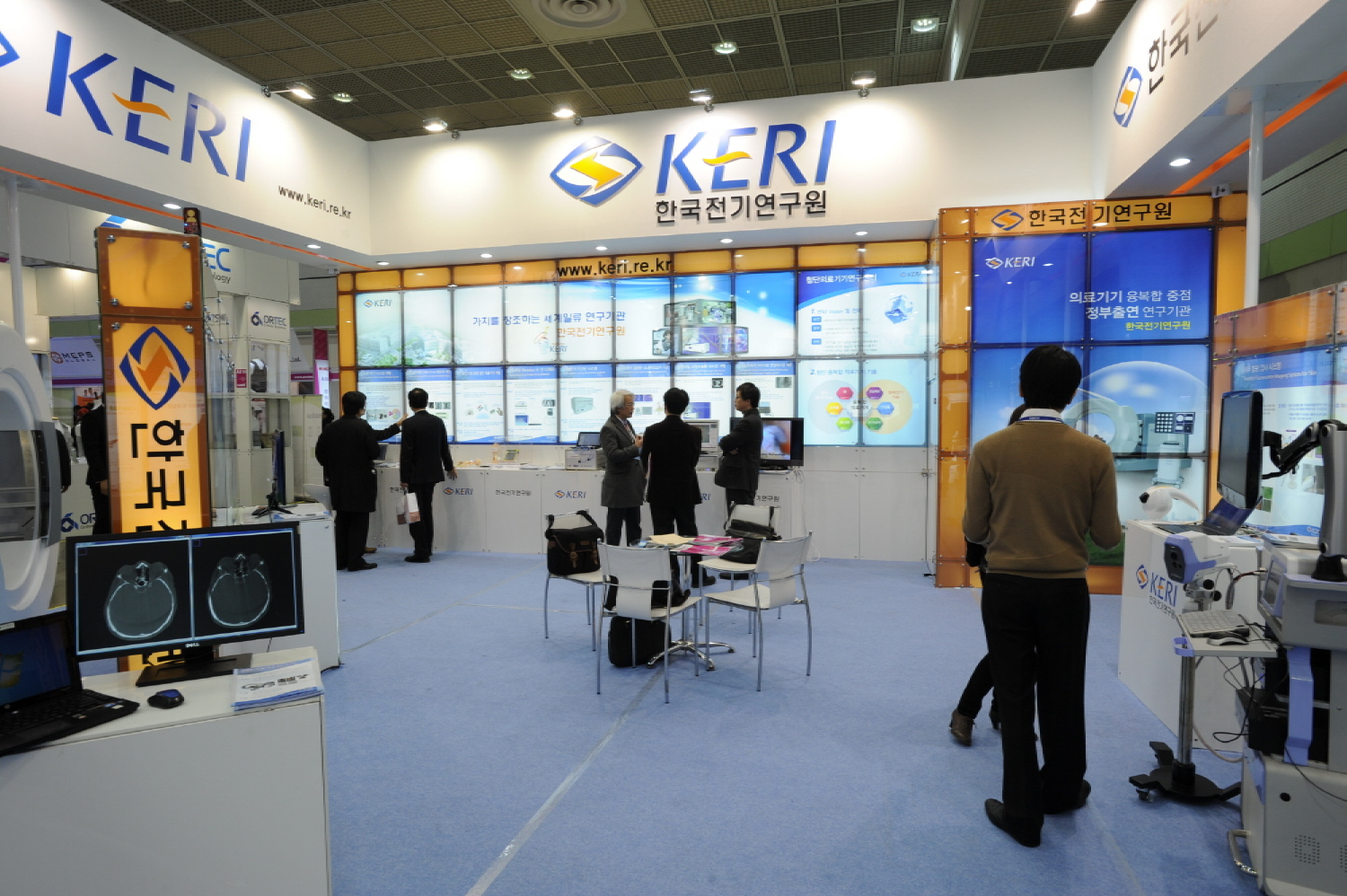
KERI booth at KIMES

== History ==
- December 29, 1976: Korea Electric Research and Testing Institute (KERTI) was established
- January 20, 1981: Korea Electrotechnology and Telecommunications Research Institute (KETRI) was established (Consolidation of KERTI and KTRI)
- June 17, 1985: Korea Electrotechnology Research Institute (KERI) was separated from KETRI

== Organization ==
- Electric Power Research Division
- Industry Applications Research Division
- Advanced Materials & Application Research Division
- Medical Devices Research Division
- High Power High Voltage Testing & Evaluation Division
- Power Apparatus Testing & Evaluation Division
- Planning & Coordination Division
- General Administration Division

== Presidents ==
- Ko Chang-seok (1985–1986)
- Ahn U-hui (1986–1993)
- Byeon Seung-bong (1993–1996
- Youn Mun-su (1996–1999)
- Kwan Yeong-hwan (1999–2005)
- Bak Dong-uk (2005–2008)
- Yu Tae-hwan (2008–2011)
- Kim Ho-yong (2011–2014)
- Bak Gyeong-yeob (2014–2017)
- Choe Gyu-ha (2018–2021)
- Myeong Seoung-ho (2021–June 10, 2022)
- Kim Nam-kyun (January 12, 2023– )

== Locations ==
- KERI Changwon (HQ): 12, Bulmosna-ro 10 beon-gil, Seongsan-gu, Changwon-si, Gyeongsangnam-do 51543, Korea
- KERI Ansan: 111, Hanggaul-ro, Sangnok-gu, Ansan-si, Gyeonggi-do 15588, Korea
- KERI Uiwang: 138, Naesonsunhwan-ro, Uiwang-si, Gyeonggi-do 16029, Korea
