= Ernesto De Pascale =

Italian music journalist and record producer (1958–2011)

Ernesto De Pascale (February 13, 1958 – February 12, 2011) was a well-known Italian music journalist and independent producer. He played piano and sang and started making music in his early teens.

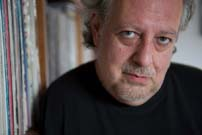
Ernesto De Pascale

== The 1970s ==
Ernesto de Pascale was born in Florence. He attended the famous Liceo Classico Dante in Florence (whose students include actors Davide Riondino and Paolo Hendel, Italian rock icon Piero Pelù, politicians and writers Giorgio Van Straten and Giovanni Gozzini, politician Matteo Renzi) from 1971 on, until he was thrown out for having destroyed his classroom by fire and physical violence. At that high school, he met the seeds of his first band (bassist and singer Alessandro Ulivi) and formed his proto psychedelic band, Implosion, with no music rules but noise. Then in 1976 Ernesto, right out of high school after some very adventurous times, put together Lightshine as a conversion from noise to redneck collar country rock in time for his first radio broadcast. Ernesto de Pascale, although he was very young, was an eyewitness to many important music events of that decade of eclecticism. Photos of early incarnation of bands as Genesis, VDGG, King Crimson, Amazing Blondel, Soft Machine, Nucleus, Audience are part of his personal collection and tons of memorabilia are stored in his house.

== The 1980s ==
In 1980 he joined RAI -Radiotelevisione italiana (The Italian National Broadcasting Corporation) as a disc jockey. In 1981 he released his first album as a musician with the band Lightshine. In 1983 he founded "HypnoDance", a Rhythm & Blues band that recorded and toured regularly until 1990. From 1982 to 1995 he was one of the leading voices of one of the most acclaimed and respected Italian music radio show, Rai StereoNotte, a nightly six hours long commercial free program which aired the best music from all over the world. In 1983 he co-founded the most important Italian meeting for independent producers and bands called "Independent Music Meeting". In 1984 and 1985 he was called to help sharpening "Videomusic", the first all music Italian television. In 1987 and 1988 he cooperated as casting consultant to “DOC”, one of RAI's most important music TV shows along the years, by a Renzo Arbore's idea. In 1989 Ernesto de Pascale wrote his first book, a Bessie Smith biography titled Bessie's Blues (Stampa Alternativa).

== The 1990s ==
In 1990 Ernesto De Pascale became consultant for Polygram Publishing, Sugar Music and Best Sound records. In 1991 he wrote the screenplay for a thriller movie called "Il guanto nero" . In the same year he won an award for the developing of Soul music in Italy and one for the developing of the independent music scene. In 1992 he wrote his first novel book, a collection of short stories called "Parole di Notte Verso Casa ". In 1993 he joined the "On the road" festival in Pelago, near Florence, with a special live project called " The Blues Corner ". In 1994 he began working for "Italia Radio" the most important all news Italian independent network with a night show called "Effetto Notte", co hosted with other famous " voices " of the "RaiStereoNotte" era. Since 1995 he has been working for Controradio with a very well acclaimed entertainment radio show called Il Popolo del Blues. He wrote liner notes for many artists and compiled various compilations. Since 1995 he's been tracing a new geography of the Italian blues scene with a collection of volumes called "This Is My Story-Il Nuovo Blues in Italia "(Sony). In 1995 he hosted a series of music radio specials about contemporary blues on RAI. In 1996 he became the musical director of the Massa Marittima "Folk Blues Festival". In the same year he was called to join the latest and newest Rai-Radio 2 music show called "Suoni e Ultrasuoni". In 1997 he won an award for developing the new Italian Blues scene and another one by the official Elvis Presley fan Club for the best radio show dedicated to Presley. Since 1981 Ernesto De Pascale has produced more than 40 albums and helped the discovery and shaping of the Italian hip hop band "Articolo 31"(Their album Così Com'è sold 600.000 copies - BMG/Best Sound, 1996). In 1995 Ernesto De Pascale founded the independent record label “Il Popolo del Blues”. In 1998 he founded Il Popolo del Blues monthly web magazine. He has been an actor making cameo appearances in movies, TV shows and videoclips. He has composed film scores and soundtracks. He is the author of the books Mondo Beat (Fuori Thema, 1993 - dedicated to the Italian 1960s scene), Dove il Country e il Soul si Incontrano, The Blues and I (a collection of interviews with the most important living bluesmen), America musica (Fuori Thema, 1994), Pistoia Blues: le interviste (Tarab, 1996).

== The 2000s ==
Ernesto De Pascale hosted the radio show “Ghiaccio Bollente” (Hot Ice) on RAI – Radio 1. Since 2000, he has become in demand outside Italy as well. Lectures in Universities and Italian Institutes of Culture have been held in 2001 and 2004 in (Munich, Germany, and Strasbourg, France). Since 1980, he has been writing for all the major news papers and magazines like Rockstar, Il Mucchio Selvaggio, L'Espresso, Il Manifesto, for the websites www.rocksbackpages.com and www.allaboutjazz.com. He currently writes for the daily paper La Nazione, for the Italian music magazines JAM, Rolling Stone Italia, Musica Jazz, for the English magazine Record Collector. For six years he worked as a hoster and producer for the Rai Sat thematic TV channels (Rai Sat Extra, Rai Sat Show). He wrote the books "Il Rock & Roll in Italia, 1956-1960" (Pendragon, 2000), "My Name is Pasquale(a biography of Nicola Arigliano, Stampa Alternativa, 2002), "Un weekend Post Moderno" (Tenax/Aida, 2002), "Anni di Musica in Toscana 1960-2000" (Toscana Musiche/Regione Toscana/Materiali sonori. Vol.1 and vol.2 - 2003, 2004) and several essays. With Il Popolo del Blues record label he kept producing musical projects as The Frank Zappa tribute albums (vol 1+2) and a big band tribute to jazz arranger Oliver Nelson (the first one since Nelson's death in 1975). In 2004 De Pascale participated as a consultant to an international Hip Hop project with Jamar Chess, son of the legendary blues producer and publisher Marshall Chess of Chicago blues's fame (published on Warner Brothers, USA ). As a musician, he reunited the bands Lightshine and Hypnodance. In 2007 he published his long-awaited first solo album, "Morning Manic Music", on Il Popolo del Blues/ Materiali Sonori. In 2004 Ernesto de Pascale started a very important songwriting partnership with UK folk rock legend Ashley Hutchings (Fairport Convention, Steeleye Span, The Albion Country Band), that resulted in the album My Land is Your Land (Cherry Red, 2008) well received all over the world. Il Popolo del Blues extended its activity and it is now a much respected PR and press company working internationally with labels such as Loose Music and Esoteric Recordings, promoting and marketing for Italy reissues as Genesis's Tony Banks "A Curious Feeling"( oct 2009) or Jack Bruce's 6 cd box set (October 2008) Ernesto de Pascale is president of the Jury of Controradio 's Rock Contest since 2001. This is the longest independent music contest going on in Italy and the book on its story is out by November 2009. He died in Florence in 2011.
