= Pilo Keri =

Albanian architect and politician

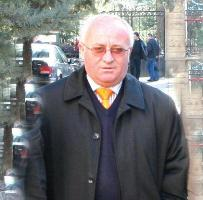

Member of the Albanian Parliament
- In office 11 September 2005 – 28 June 2009

Personal details
- Born: 25 December 1956 (age 69) Kutalli, Albania
- Profession: Architect

Pilo Kristaq Keri (born December 25, 1956) is an architect and former member of the Parliament of Republic of Albania.

== Professional career ==
Keri was born in Kutalli, a village in Berat District in the present-day municipality of Ura Vajgurore. He studied Architecture at the University of Tirana, graduating in 1979. After a compulsory working year in Kukës, he was relocated as an Architect in the Institute of Pedagogical Studies (ISP) Tirana, where he stayed for three years.

- In 1984, he returned in Berat as member of the Project Bureau, for two years.
- In 1986, he joined the Communal Constructions Council of Kuçova where he would take the roles of Head of Engineers and Director.
- 1995 - 2005 would be the years he dedicated to the private construction business in various regions of Albania, such as: Kuçova, Berat, Kavaja, Durres, Tirana, Elbasan etc.
- In 1999, he was amongst 15 architects from Albania selected to undertake a professional training, at Arizona State University.
- 2005 would be the latest achievement in his long career when he was awarded the title of Doctor of Architecture from Leibniz University Institute of Arts and Science, USA.

== Political career ==
- Member of the 17th Parliament Legislature, from the Proportional List.
- Member of the Production and Environmental Parliamentary Commission.
- Member of the Parliamentary Commission for the "Investigation of Auction Procedures for the Construction of Durres-Morine" and for the "Investigation of the Expenses made from the State Budged towards Ministries from the years 2001 and Onwards".
