= Ceri =

Coordinates: 41°59′43″N 12°09′12″E

- Frazione
- Location of Ceri in Italy
- Country: Italy
- Region: Lazio
- Province: Rome Capital (RM)
- Comune: Cerveteri
- Time zone: UTC+1 (CET)
  - Summer (DST): UTC+2 (CEST)

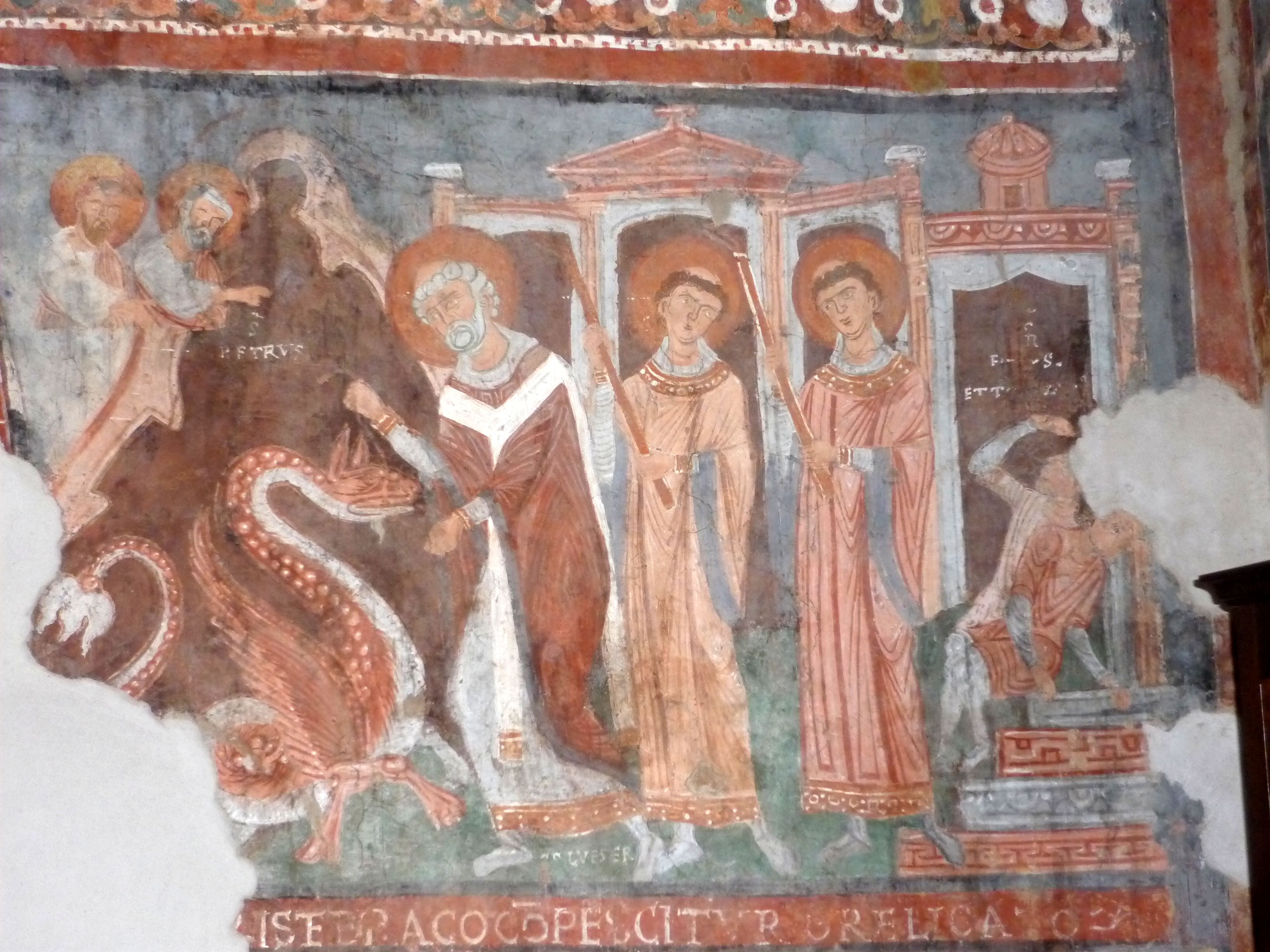
Fresco-style icons in the church of Madonna di Ceri (12th century)

Ceri (Italian pronunciation: [ˈtʃɛːri]) is a hamlet (frazione) of the comune of Cerveteri, in the Metropolitan City of Rome, Lazio (central Italy). It occupies a fortified plateau of tuff at a short distance from the city of Cerveteri.

== History ==
Inhabited before the 7th century BC, the town's native population changed several times, from Etruscans to Romans. Numerous tombs from the Etruscan and Roman periods can be found in the area.

The town as it looks today was founded in 1236 when the inhabitants of its Caere neighbour abandoned the former to be better protected by rock formations. To this, they gave the name of Caere Novum (simply Ceri, not to be confused with another neighbour, Cerenova), in order to distinguish it from the ancient city, Caere Vetus (today Cerveteri). In the same period, the castle was constructed for the defence of the town.

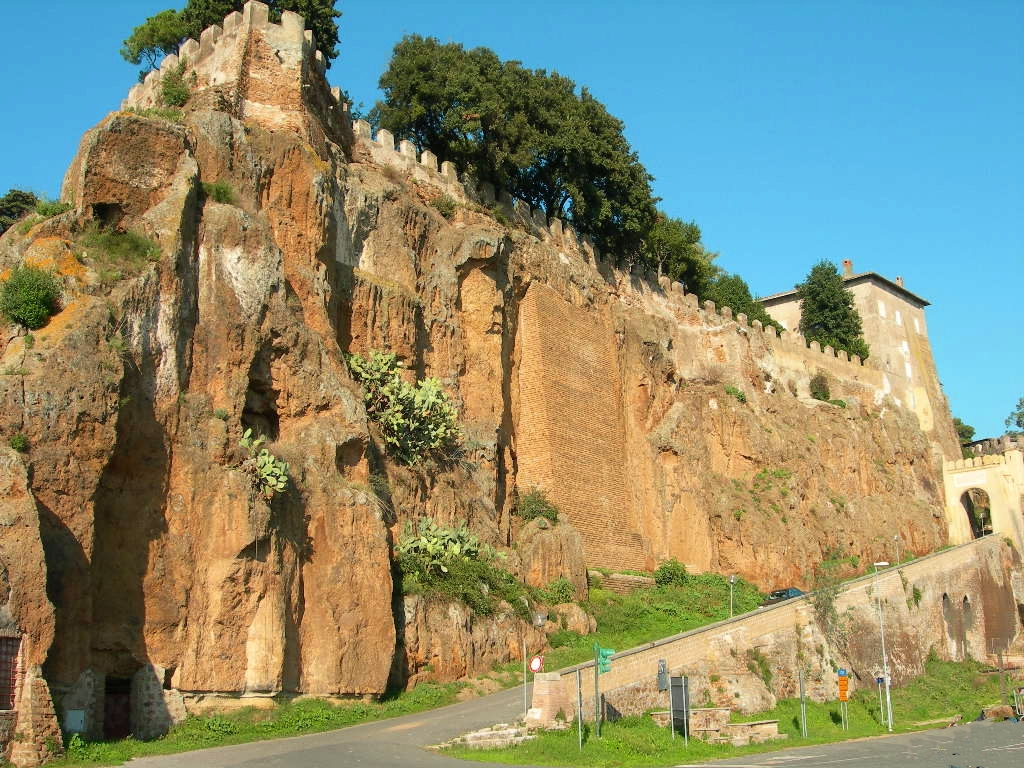
View of fortified walls.

Since the 14th century, Ceri became the property of some of the greatest Italian families: from the Anguillara (of which the greatest exponent was Renzo da Ceri) to Cesi, the Borromeo, the Odescalchi, and ended with the Torlonia, who are still owners of a large part of Ceri.

== Main sights ==
The main attraction is the Romanesque Church of the Madonna di Ceri, which stands on an ancient site where Etruscans and Romans venerated the cult of the goddess Vesta. In 1980, during a restoration, frescoes from approximately the 12th century, representing some scenes drawn from Old Testament, were discovered on a wall of the church building.
