= Eremolepidaceae =

Family of flowering plants

Eremolepidaceae is treated in some systems as a family of flowering plants in the order Santalales. In the Takhtajan system it consists of the genera Antidaphne (including Eremolepsis), Eubrachion and Lepidoceras.

In the APG III system this is part of the Santalaceae family and the Dicot family.
