= Viscaceae =

Family of flowering plants

Viscaceae is a taxonomic family name of flowering plants. In this circumscription, the family includes the several genera of mistletoes. This family name is currently being studied and under review as in past decades, several systems of plant taxonomy recognized this family, notably the 1981 Cronquist system.

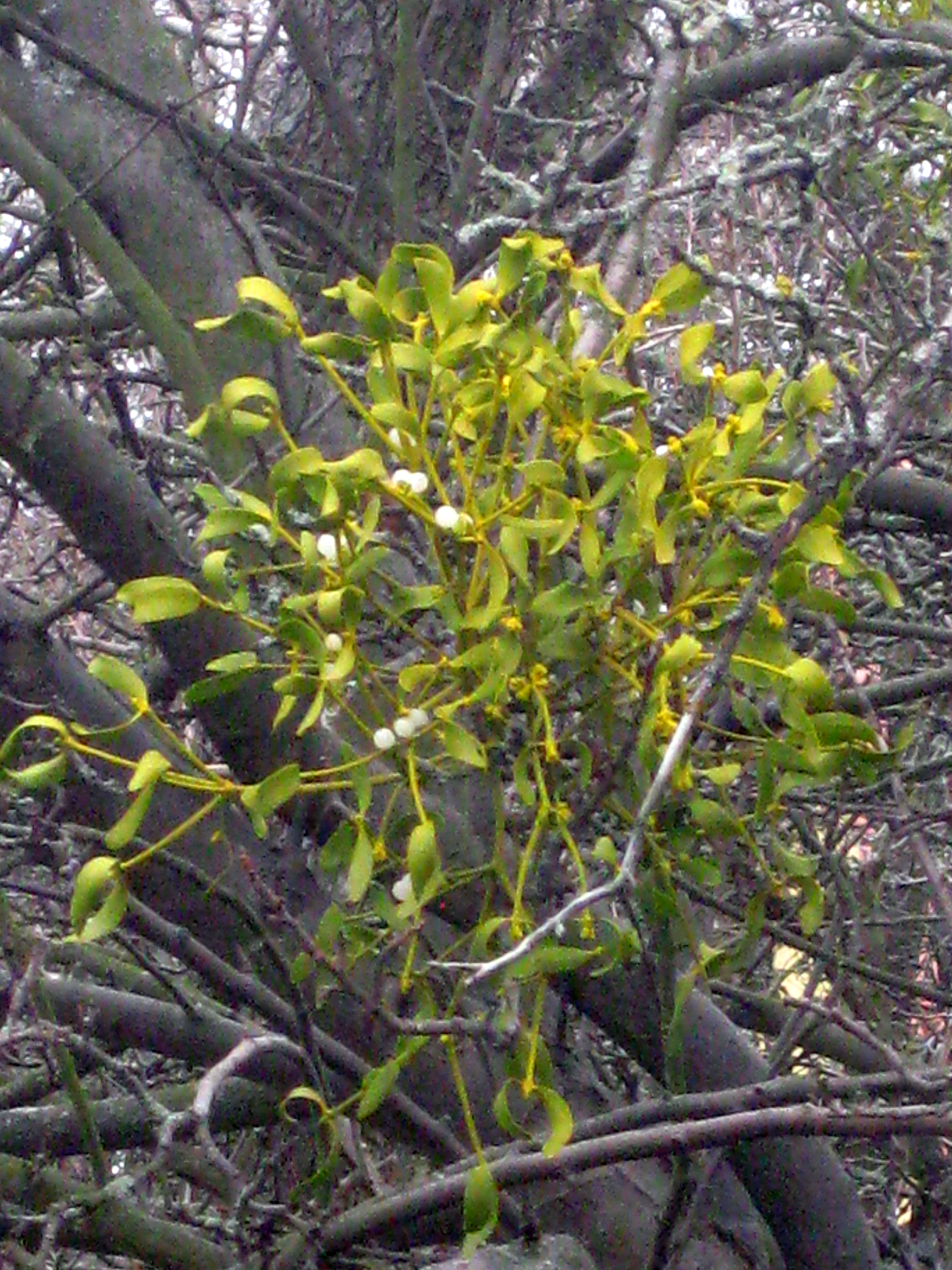
Viscum spp.

However, the APG II system of 2003 does not recognize the family, treating it as a synonym of Santalaceae. This did not end the taxonomic debate among botanists and there are many that still think Viscaceae should be an accepted family name. According to the APG IV system, Der and Nickrent (2008) found seven well supported clades in Santalaceae, but relationships between these clades are still poorly understood. The traditional and cultural uses of species within the Viscaceae merit further attention.

Clades or genera treated as belonging to the currently debated family name Viscaceae include:

- Arceuthobium
- Dendrophthora
- Ginalloa
- Korthalsella
- Notothixos
- Phoradendron
- Viscum
