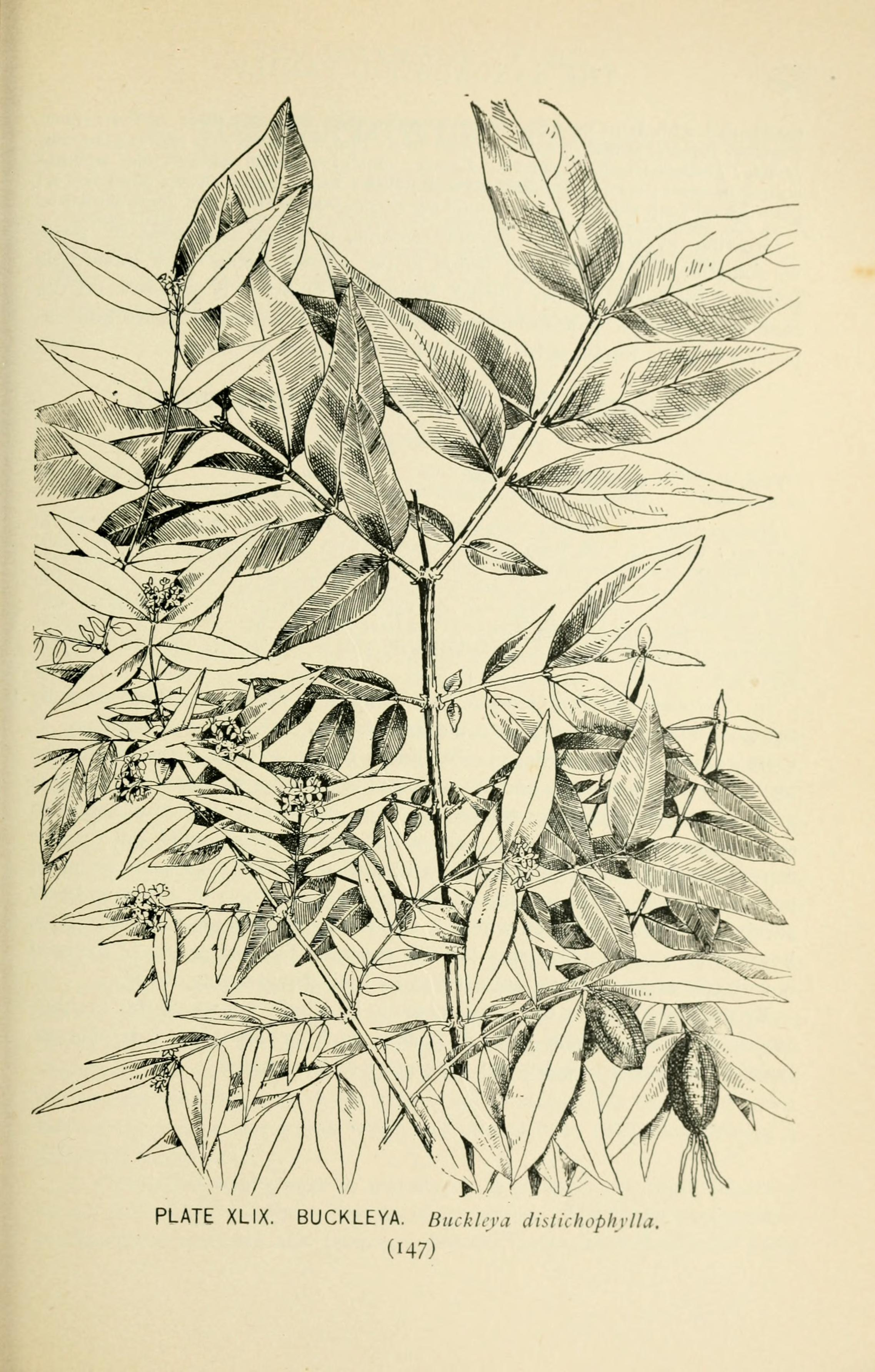

Conservation status
- Vulnerable (NatureServe)

Scientific classification
- Kingdom: Plantae
- Clade: Tracheophytes
- Clade: Angiosperms
- Clade: Eudicots
- Order: Santalales
- Family: Santalaceae
- Genus: Buckleya
- Species: B. distichophylla

Binomial name
- Buckleya distichophylla (Nutt.) Torr.

Synonyms
- Borya distichophylla Nutt. 1818; Forestiera disticha Raf.; Forestiera heterophyla Raf.; Nestronia undulata Raf.

= Buckleya distichophylla =

Species of flowering plant

Buckleya distichophylla, commonly called piratebush, is a flowering plant in the family Santalaceae, native to the Southern United States. It is a rare plant, found only in sporadic mountainous areas of North Carolina, Tennessee, and Virginia.

Buckleya distichophylla is a deciduous shrub growing to heights of up to 15 feet (4.6 m), with leaves that are 2-4 inches (5.1-10.2 cm) in length requiring direct sunlight to grow. Its flowers are 1 inch (2.5 cm) long with 4 yellow-green, long narrow bracts. What makes the piratebush unique is in how it survives. The plant does not survive on photosynthesis only as its pale green leaves indicate less chlorophyll than other plants. In addition to photosynthesis, piratebush receives nutrients through parasitizing other species. The plant is hemiparasitic, attaching itself to the root systems of other plants with structures called haustoria and draw nutrients through them. Although originally thought to attach itself only to hemlock trees, it has since been determined that piratebush can attach to many different species.

At present, piratebush has only been identified in mountainous areas of North Carolina, Tennessee, and Virginia. The greatest concentration of the plant can be found within the Poor Mountain Natural Area Preserve atop Poor Mountain, approximately 2 miles (3.2 km) southwest of Roanoke in Roanoke County, Virginia. The number of piratebush plants on Poor Mountain is greater than all of the others existing at other locations. Although many other locations in the Appalachians feature habitats that seemingly would support piratebush, scientists have yet to determine why the plant exists in so few places.

The plant was initially discovered and described as a member of the genus Borya in the olive family by Thomas Nuttall in 1818 along the French Broad River in the vicinity of Paint Rock in Western North Carolina. The plant was rediscovered in 1843 by Samuel Buckley with John Torrey classifying the plant as Buckleya distichophylla.

== Gallery ==
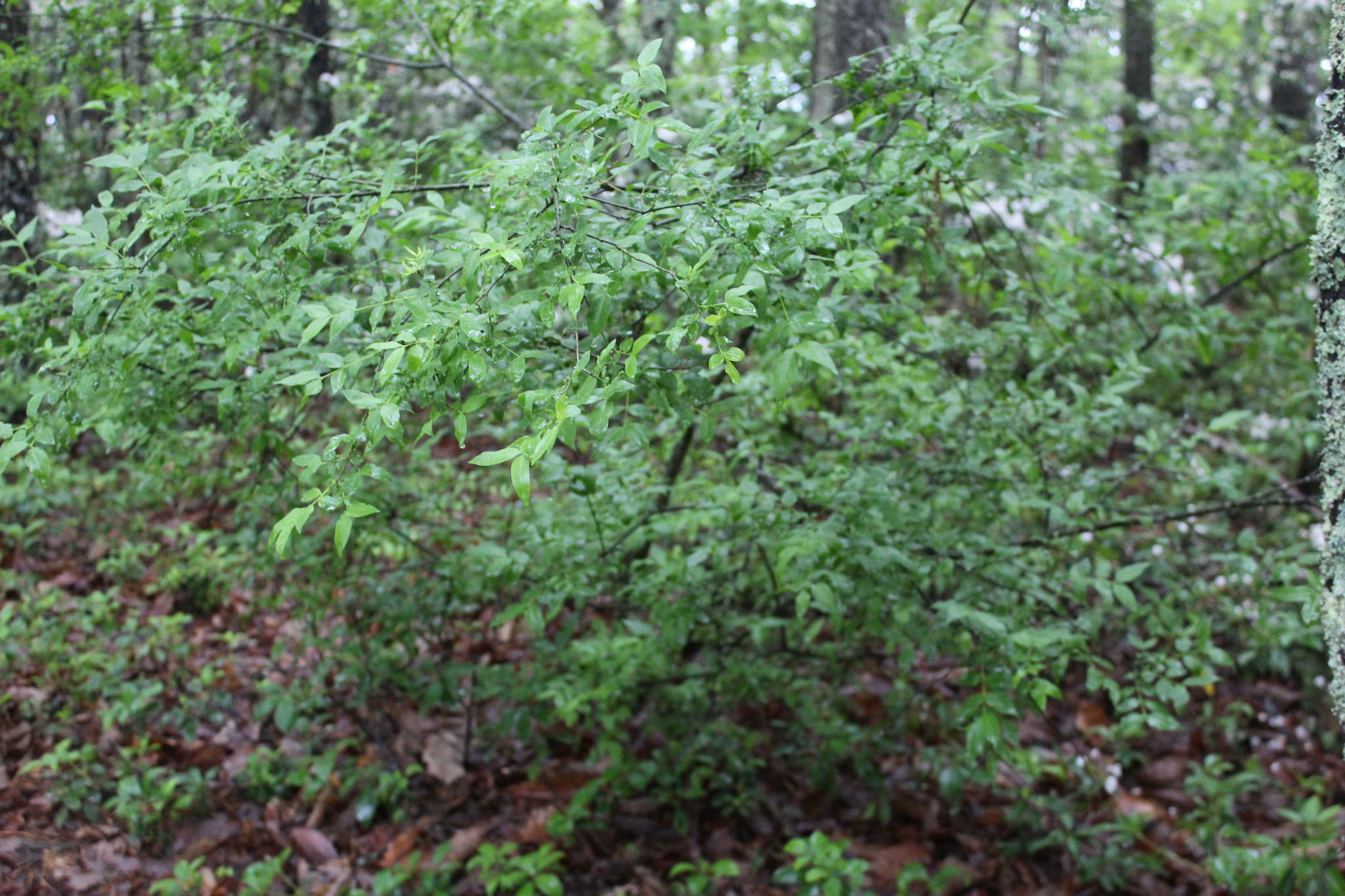
Shrubby growth habit

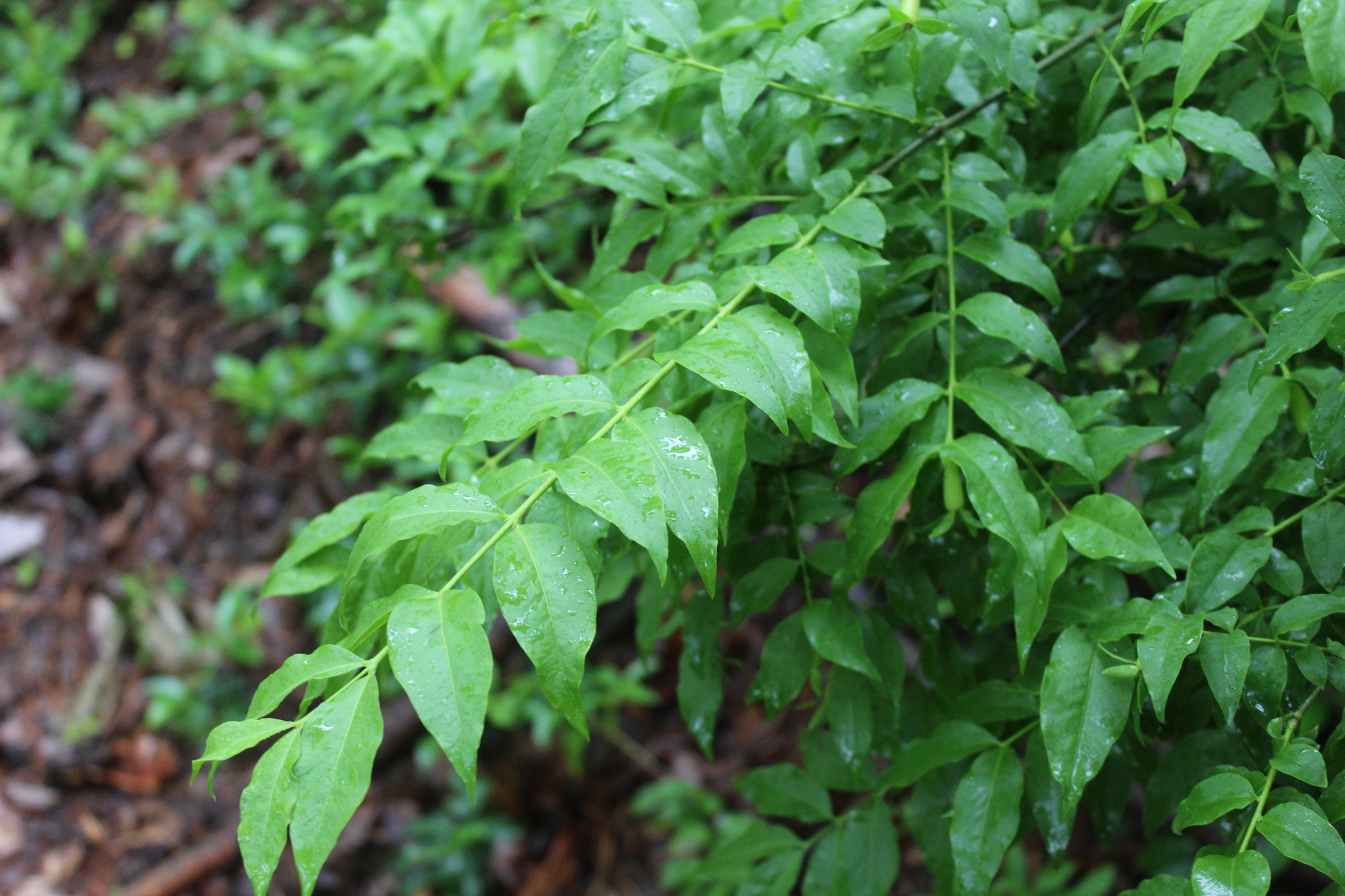
Leaves

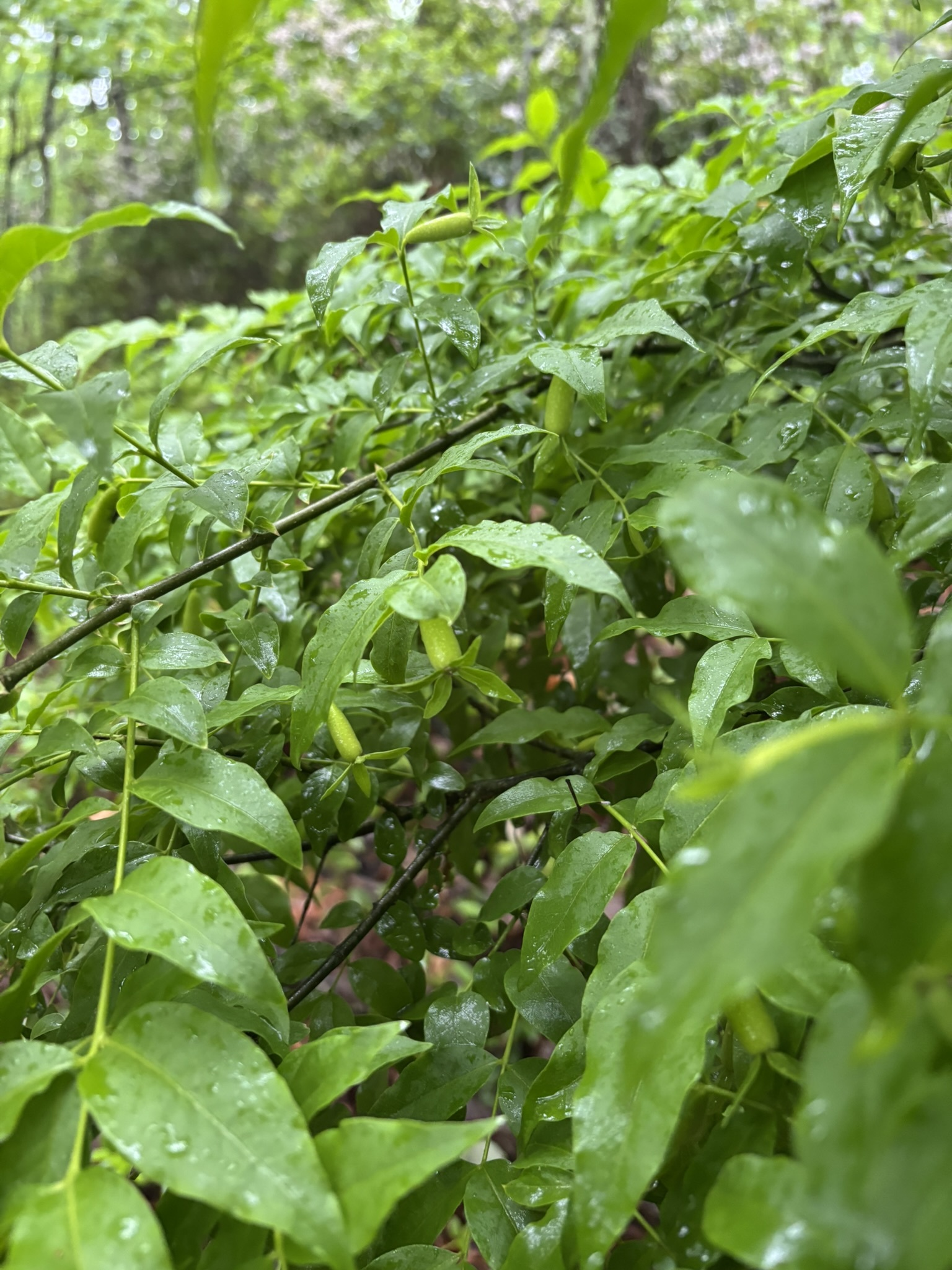
Ovary and leaves
