= Alloneuron =

Scientific classification
- Kingdom: Plantae
- Clade: Tracheophytes
- Clade: Angiosperms
- Clade: Eudicots
- Clade: Rosids
- Order: Myrtales
- Family: Melastomataceae
- Genus: Alloneuron; Pilg.

Genus of flowering plants

Alloneuron is a genus of plant in family Melastomataceae. It contains the following species (shrubs or trees):

1. Alloneuron glomeratum C.Ulloa & Michelang.
2. Alloneuron liron B.Walln.
3. Alloneuron majus (Markgr.) Markgr. ex J.F.Macbr.
4. Alloneuron ronliesneri B.Walln.
5. Alloneuron ulei Pilg.

Synonyms:

The new genus Wurdastom is described to include 8 species described by Wurdack,

- Alloneuron bullatum Wurdack = Wurdastom bullata (Wurdack) B.Walln.
- Alloneuron cuatrecasasii Wurdack = Wurdastom cuatrecasasii (Wurdack) B.Walln.
- Alloneuron dorrii, Wurdack = Wurdastom dorrii (Wurdack) B.Walln.
- Alloneuron dudleyi Wurdack = Wurdastom dudleyi (Wurdack) B.Walln.
- Alloneuron ecuadorense, Wurdack = Wurdastom ecuadorensis (Wurdack) B.Walln.
- Alloneuron hexamerum Wurdack = Wurdastom hexamera (Wurdack) B.Walln.
- Alloneuron sneidernii Wurdack = Wurdastom sneidernii (Wurdack) B.Walln.
- Alloneuron subglabrum Wurdack = Wurdastom subglabra (Wurdack) B.Walln.
