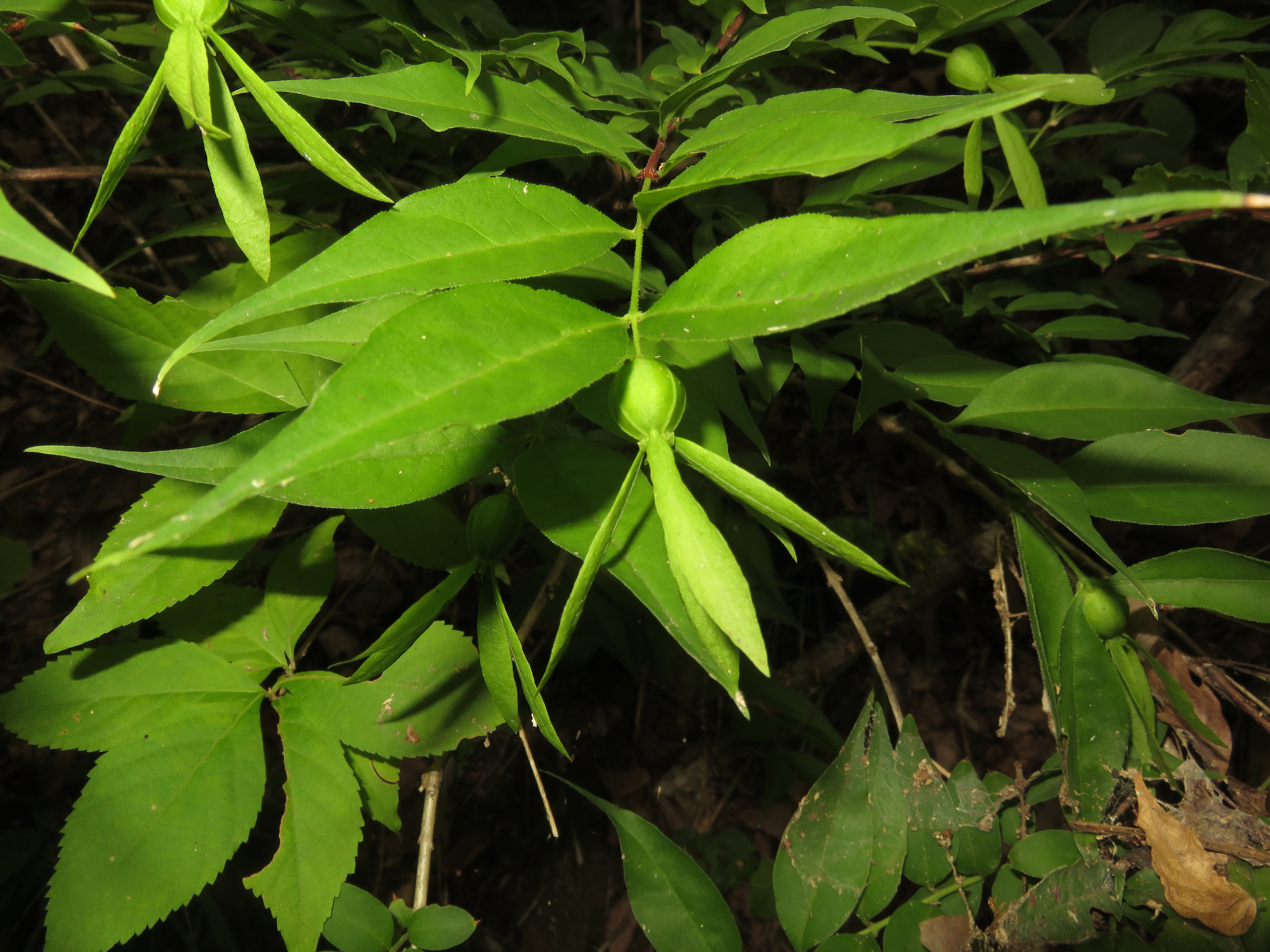
- Buckleya lanceolata

Scientific classification
- Kingdom: Plantae
- Clade: Tracheophytes
- Clade: Angiosperms
- Clade: Eudicots
- Order: Santalales
- Family: Santalaceae
- Genus: Buckleya; Torr. 1843

Type species
- Buckleya distichophylla (Nutt.) Torr.

Synonyms
- Nestronia Raf., rejected name

= Buckleya =

Genus of flowering plants in the mistletoe family

Buckleya is an Asian and American genus of hemiparasitic shrubs in the sandalwood family. It is named for Samuel Botsford Buckley. Buckleya is also known as piratebush. Plants of this species are dioecious, meaning that male and female flowers are on separate plants.

== Species ==
- Buckleya angulosa S.B.Zhou & X.H.Guo – eastern China
- Buckleya distichophylla (Nutt.) Torr. – southeastern United States
- Buckleya graebneriana Diels – central China
- Buckleya lanceolata (Siebold & Zucc.) Miq. – Japan, China
