= Greater Beedelup National Park =

Protected area in the South West region of Western Australia

- IUCN category II (national park)
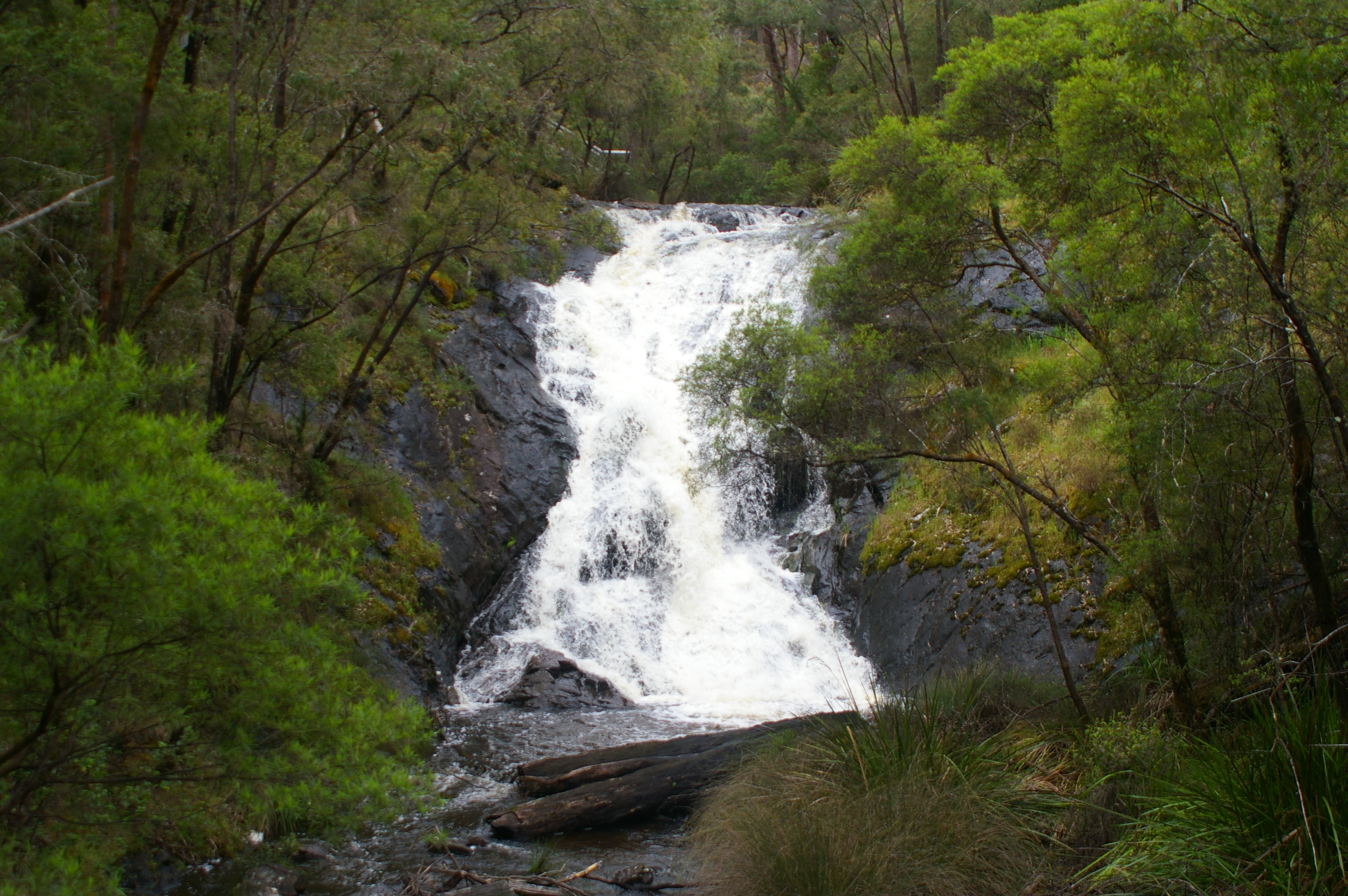
- Beedelup Falls

- Location within Western Australia
- Location: Western Australia
- Nearest city: Pemberton
- Coordinates: 34°25′06″S 115°52′40″E
- Area: 17.83 km^{2} (6.88 sq mi)
- Established: 1915
- Governing body: Department of Parks and Wildlife
- Website: Official website

Greater Beedelup National Park is a national park in Western Australia, 277 km south of Perth. It is situated on the Vasse Highway 10 km west of Pemberton. The park is especially lush and damp due to an abundance of water.

Gazetted in 1910, the park was declared an A Class Reserve in 1915. The Pemberton National Parks Board has been responsible for management of the park since 1957. Controlled burns occur within the park and some clear felling operations have been conducted in selected areas that used to be State Forests but have also been regenerated since.

The park is mostly karri forest, with mixed areas of jarrah and marri. The loamy soil supports large colonies of moss and plants such as the swamp peppermint, hibbertia, karri hazel, waterbush, myrtle wattle and lemon-scented darwinia, all of which thrive in the damp conditions. Some of the forest is an excellent example of uncut old-growth forest. Some of the upland areas are sandy and support communities of heath vegetation. Other plants of interest in the area include Crowea dentata, Crowea augustifolia and Choretrum lateriflorum.

Some rare fauna are thought to inhabit the area, including the woylie, numbat and the tammar.

Its major attraction is the Beedelup Falls, which are in full flow during winter and spring. A suspension bridge, built in 1995, offers passage across Beedelup Brook and good views of the falls.

Another feature of the park is the "walk through karri tree", a 400-year-old tree with a large man-made hole cut through at the base large enough for a person to stand in.

The park is named after Beedelup Brook, named in 1875. It is thought the name Beedelup is derived from the Noongar word Beejalup meaning place of rest or place of sleep.

== Facilities ==
An admission fee applies for this park, and camping is not permitted. A signed walking trail around Beedelup Falls, a rest area, picnic area and toilets are available for use by visitors.

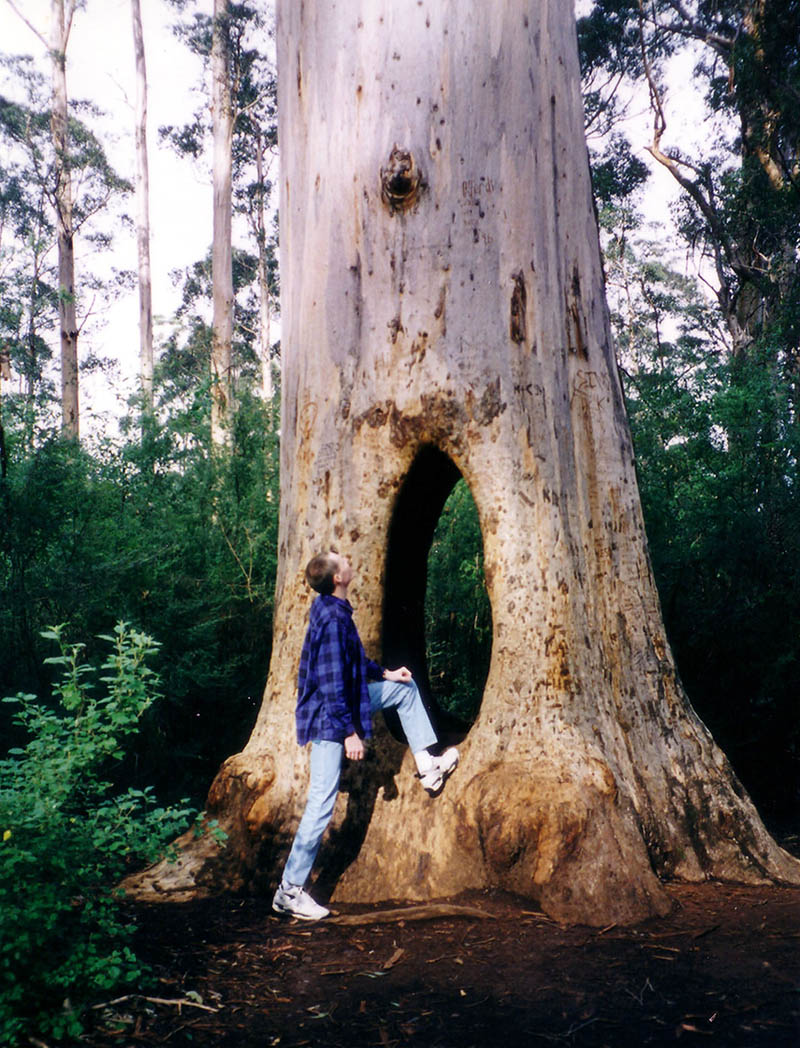
Walk through karri tree

== See also ==
- Protected areas of Western Australia
