= Notothixos subaureus =

Scientific classification
- Kingdom: Plantae
- Clade: Tracheophytes
- Clade: Angiosperms
- Clade: Eudicots
- Order: Santalales
- Family: Santalaceae
- Genus: Notothixos
- Species: N. subaureus

Binomial name
- Notothixos subaureus Oliv.

Synonyms
- Viscum subaureum F. Muell. ex Oliver. Notothixos subaureus var. cinereus Blakely

Species of flowering plant

Notothixos subaureus is a species of mistletoe plant in the family Santalaceae; it can be found in eastern Australia.
