= Sceloenopla unicostata =

Scientific classification
- Kingdom: Animalia
- Phylum: Arthropoda
- Class: Insecta
- Order: Coleoptera
- Suborder: Polyphaga
- Infraorder: Cucujiformia
- Family: Chrysomelidae
- Genus: Sceloenopla
- Species: S. unicostata

Binomial name
- Sceloenopla unicostata Staines, 2002

Species of beetle

Sceloenopla unicostata is a species of beetle of the family Chrysomelidae. It is found in Costa Rica.

== Description ==
Adults reach a length of about 7.9-9.3 mm. The antennae and elytra (except for the lateral and apical margins) are black, while the head and pronotum (except for the base) are rosaceous.

== Life history ==
The larvae have been recorded mining the leaves of an unidentified Viscaceae species.

== Etymology ==
The species name is derived from the Latin word uni (meaning one) and costa (meaning rib) and refers to the one costa on each elytron.
