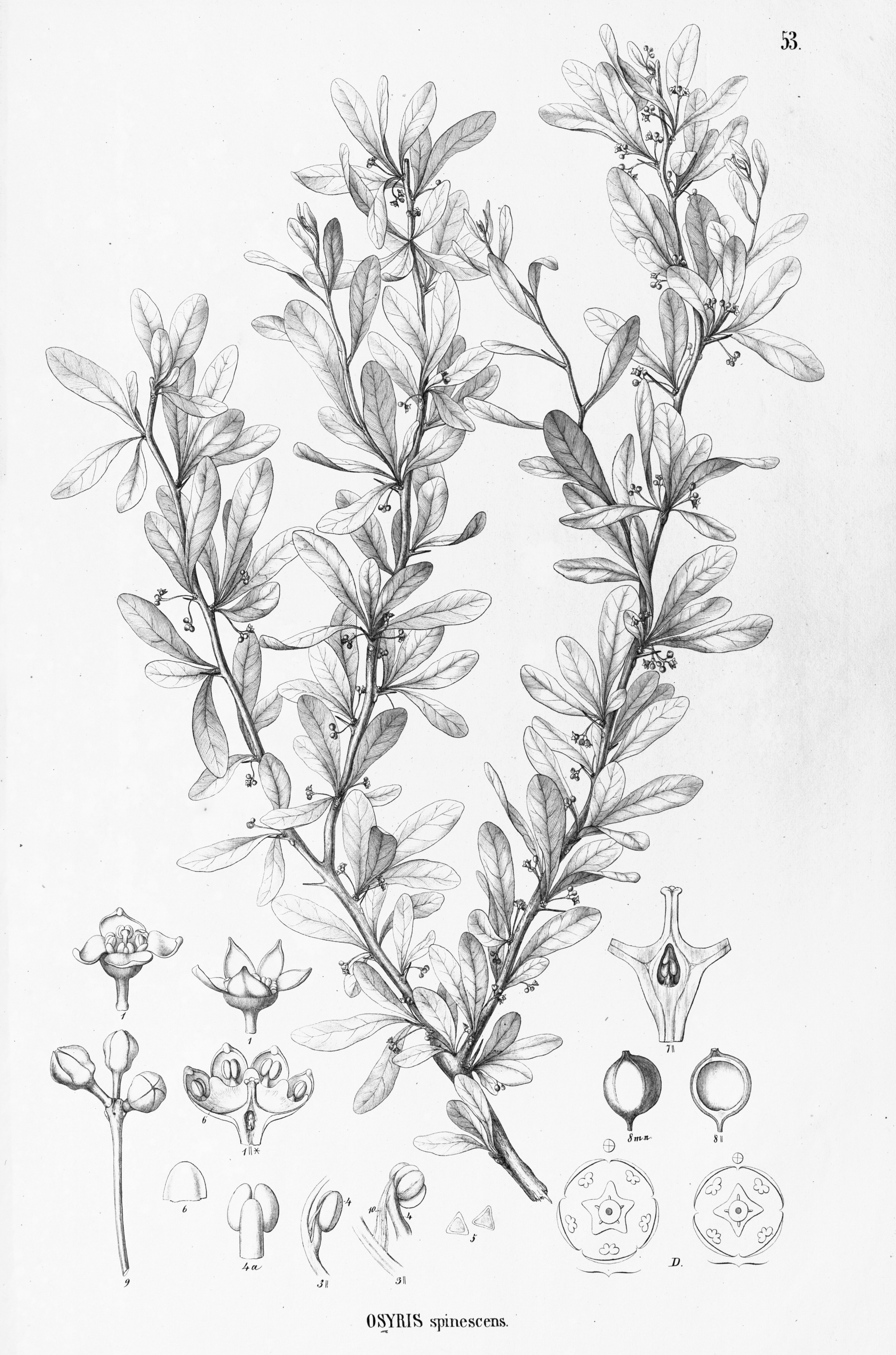

Conservation status
- Least Concern (IUCN 3.1)

Scientific classification
- Kingdom: Plantae
- Clade: Embryophytes
- Clade: Tracheophytes
- Clade: Spermatophytes
- Clade: Angiosperms
- Clade: Eudicots
- Order: Santalales
- Family: Santalaceae
- Genus: Acanthosyris
- Species: A. spinescens

Binomial name
- Acanthosyris spinescens (Mart. & Eichler) Griseb.

Synonyms
- Osyris spinescens Mart. & Eichler; Acanthosyris platensis Speg.

= Acanthosyris spinescens =

Species of plant

Acanthosyris spinescens, locally named Sombra de touro or quebradillo is a spiny, native tree with a native range in Uruguay, Argentina, and Brazil. As a pioneer species, it grows well in new forest areas in semi-shaded areas, but grows slowly. The tree has a yellow edible fruit, and is slow growing. Traditional medicine includes uses of the leaves to treat fevers and ulcers. The tree was first documented in 1879, Abh. Königl. Ges. Wiss. Göttingen 24: 151 (1879).
