= Acanthosyris annonagustata =

Conservation status
- Near Threatened (IUCN 3.1)

Scientific classification
- Kingdom: Plantae
- Clade: Tracheophytes
- Clade: Angiosperms
- Clade: Eudicots
- Order: Santalales
- Family: Santalaceae
- Genus: Acanthosyris
- Species: A. annonagustata

Binomial name
- Acanthosyris annonagustata C.Ulloa & P.Jørg.

Species of flowering plant

Acanthosyris annonagustata is a species of plant in the Santalaceae family. It is endemic to Ecuador.
