= Acanthosyris asipapote =

Conservation status
- Vulnerable (IUCN 2.3)

Scientific classification
- Kingdom: Plantae
- Clade: Tracheophytes
- Clade: Angiosperms
- Clade: Eudicots
- Order: Santalales
- Family: Santalaceae
- Genus: Acanthosyris
- Species: A. asipapote

Binomial name
- Acanthosyris asipapote M. Nee

Species of flowering plant

Acanthosyris asipapote is a species of plant in the Santalaceae family. It is endemic to Bolivia. It is threatened by habitat loss.
