= Henslowia =

Henslowia may refer to:

- Henslowia Blume, a genus of plants in the family Santalaceae, synonym of Dendrotrophe Miq.
- Henslowia Wall, a genus of plants in the family Crypteroniaceae, synonym of Crypteronia Blume
- Henslowia, a genus of plants in the family Oleaceae, synonym of Picconia
