= Nanodea =

Scientific classification
- Kingdom: Plantae
- Clade: Tracheophytes
- Clade: Angiosperms
- Clade: Eudicots
- Order: Santalales
- Family: Santalaceae
- Genus: Nanodea; Banks ex C.F.Gaertn.
- Species: N. muscosa

Binomial name
- Nanodea muscosa Banks ex C.F.Gaertn.

Genus of plants

Nanodea is a monotypic genus of flowering plants belonging to the family Santalaceae. The only species is Nanodea muscosa.

Its native range is Southern South America, Falkland Islands.
