= Dendromyza =

Scientific classification
- Kingdom: Plantae
- Clade: Tracheophytes
- Clade: Angiosperms
- Clade: Eudicots
- Order: Santalales
- Family: Santalaceae
- Genus: Dendromyza; Danser

Genus of plants

Dendromyza is a genus of flowering plants belonging to the family Santalaceae. They are dioecious stem-parasitic shrubs.

Its native range is Malesia to Solomon Islands.

Species:

- Dendromyza acrosclera (Danser) Byng & Christenh.
- Dendromyza acutata (Pilg.) Byng & Christenh.
- Dendromyza angustifolia (Stauffer) Byng & Christenh.
- Dendromyza crassifolia (Gibbs) Stauffer
- Dendromyza cucullata (Danser) Stauffer
- Dendromyza cuneata (Danser) Byng & Christenh.
- Dendromyza dendromyzoides (Stauffer) Byng & Christenh.
- Dendromyza densa (Stauffer) Byng & Christenh.
- Dendromyza dubia (Stauffer) Byng & Christenh.
- Dendromyza erecta (Danser) Byng & Christenh.
- Dendromyza gracilis (Danser) Byng & Christenh.
- Dendromyza hiepkoana J.M.Macklin & J.Parn.
- Dendromyza intricata (Danser) Stauffer
- Dendromyza kaniensis (Pilg.) Byng & Christenh.
- Dendromyza laevis (Pilg.) Byng & Christenh.
- Dendromyza latifolia (Danser) Byng & Christenh.
- Dendromyza ledermannii (Pilg.) Stauffer
- Dendromyza microphylla (Lauterb.) Byng & Christenh.
- Dendromyza multinervis (Danser) Byng & Christenh.
- Dendromyza nivalis (Ridl.) Byng & Christenh.
- Dendromyza pachydisca (Danser) J.M.Macklin ex Beaman & C.E.Anderson
- Dendromyza puberula Stauffer
- Dendromyza reinwardtiana (Blume) Danser
- Dendromyza robustior (Danser) Byng & Christenh.
- Dendromyza salomonia Danser
- Dendromyza staufferi J.M.Macklin & J.Parn.
- Dendromyza stellata (Stauffer) Byng & Christenh.
- Dendromyza trinervia (Stauffer) Byng & Christenh.
- Dendromyza uncinata (Danser) Byng & Christenh.
- Dendromyza volubilis Stauffer
