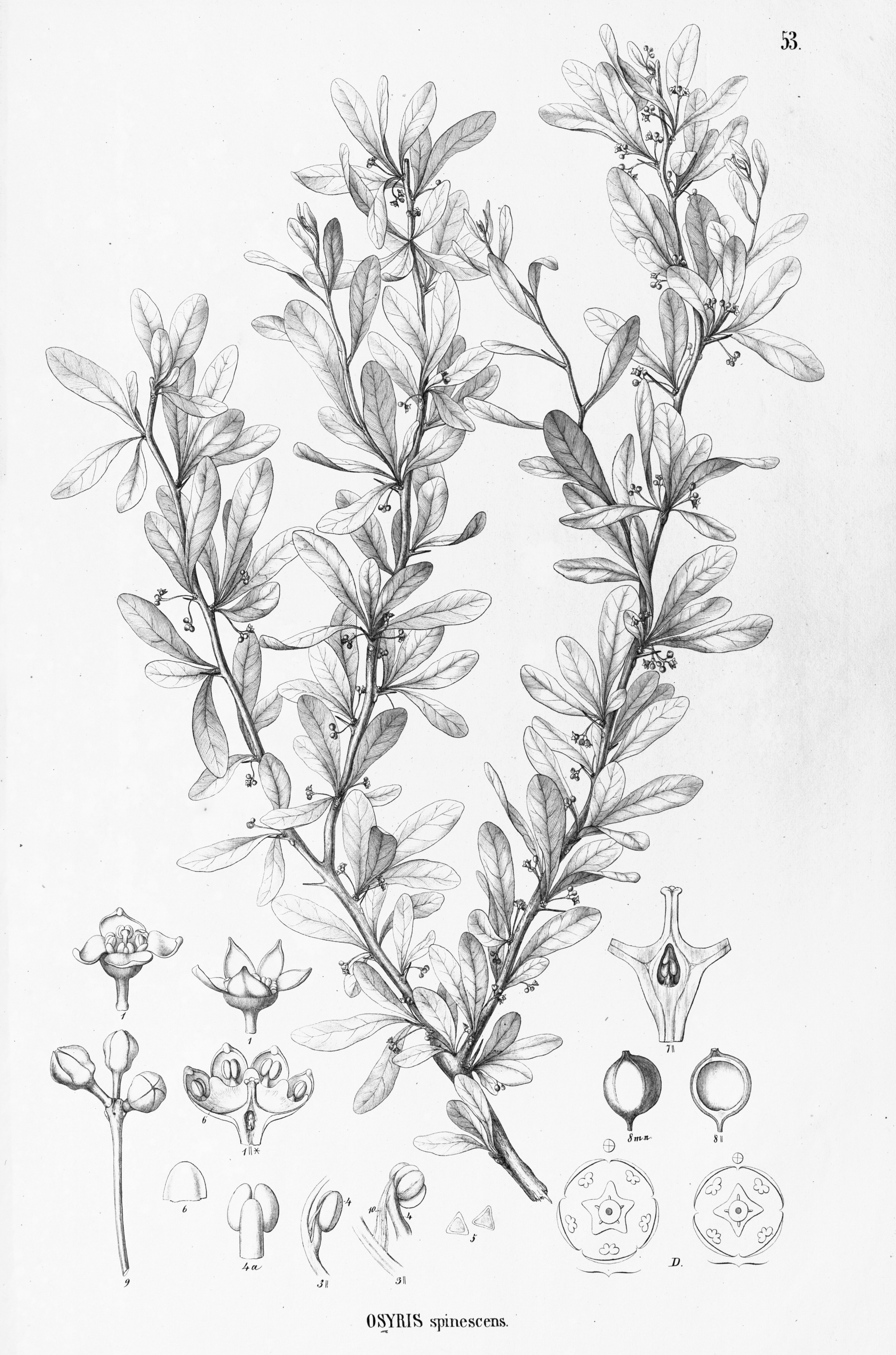
- Acanthosyris spinescens

Scientific classification
- Kingdom: Plantae
- Clade: Tracheophytes
- Clade: Angiosperms
- Clade: Eudicots
- Order: Santalales
- Family: Santalaceae
- Genus: Acanthosyris (Eichler) Griseb.

= Acanthosyris =

Genus of flowering plants in the mistletoe family

Acanthosyris is a genus of plants in the family Santalaceae. It contains the following species:

1. Acanthosyris annonagustata C.Ulloa & P.M.Jørg.
2. Acanthosyris asipapote M.Nee
3. Acanthosyris falcata Griseb.
4. Acanthosyris glabrata (Stapf) Stauffer ex Govaerts
5. Acanthosyris paulo-alvinii G.M.Barroso – mata cacau
6. Acanthosyris spinescens (Mart. & Eichler) Griseb.
