= Cervantesia =

Scientific classification
- Kingdom: Plantae
- Clade: Tracheophytes
- Clade: Angiosperms
- Clade: Eudicots
- Order: Santalales
- Family: Santalaceae
- Genus: Cervantesia; Ruiz & Pavón

Species
- Cervantesia bicolor Cav.; Cervantesia tomentosa Ruiz & Pav.

Genus of flowering plants in the mistletoe family

Cervantesia is a genus of plants in the family Santalaceae. It contains two species native to the Andes, ranging from Colombia to Bolivia.
