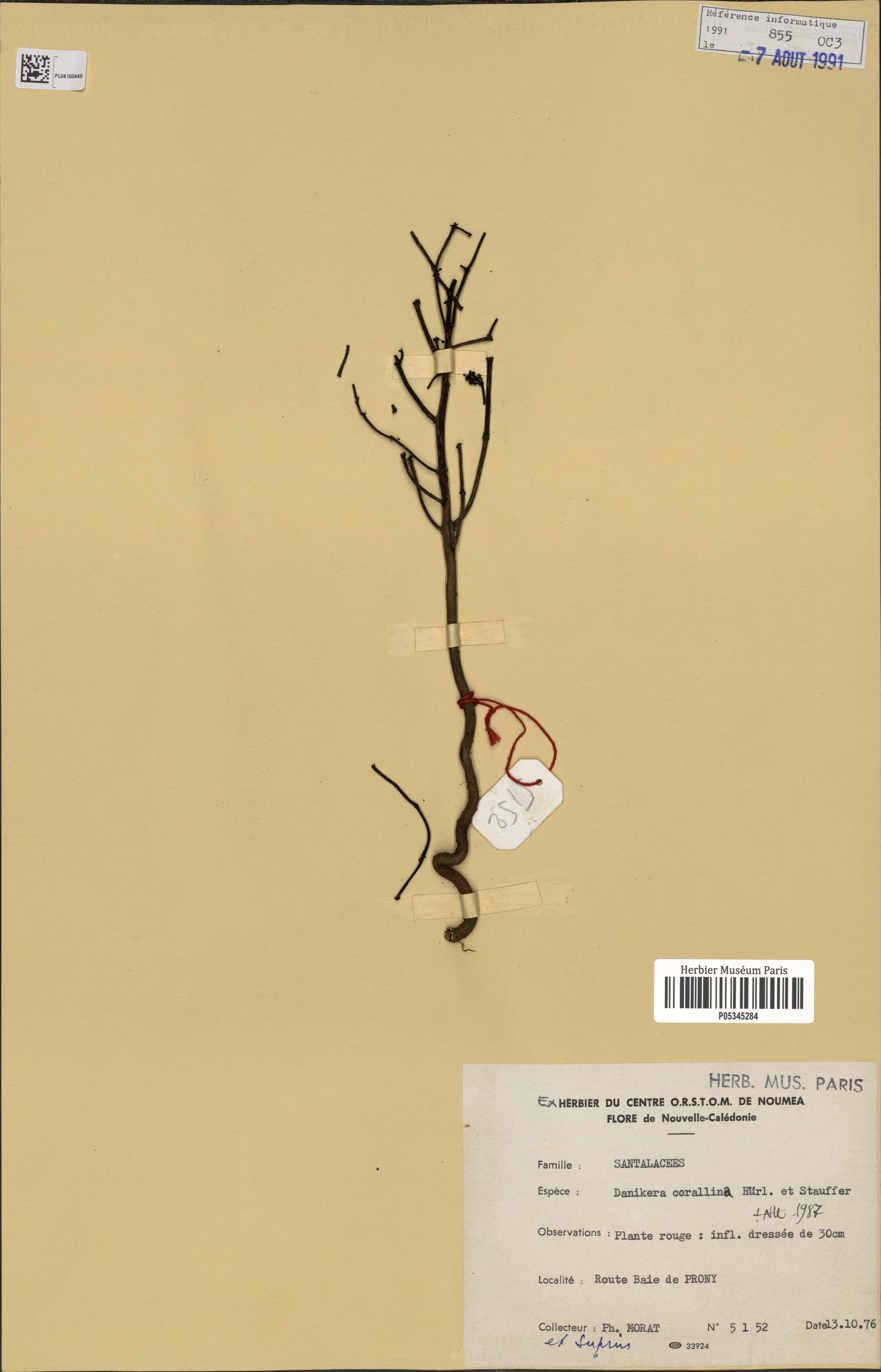

Scientific classification
- Kingdom: Plantae
- Clade: Tracheophytes
- Clade: Angiosperms
- Clade: Eudicots
- Order: Santalales
- Family: Santalaceae
- Genus: Daenikera; Hürl. & Stauffer
- Species: D. corallina

Binomial name
- Daenikera corallina Hürl. & Stauffer

= Daenikera =

Species of flowering plant in the mistletoe family

Daenikera corallina is a plant parasite species in the Santalaceae family. It is endemic to New Caledonia and the only species of the genus Daenikera. Its closest relative is Amphorogyne, also endemic to New Caledonia.
