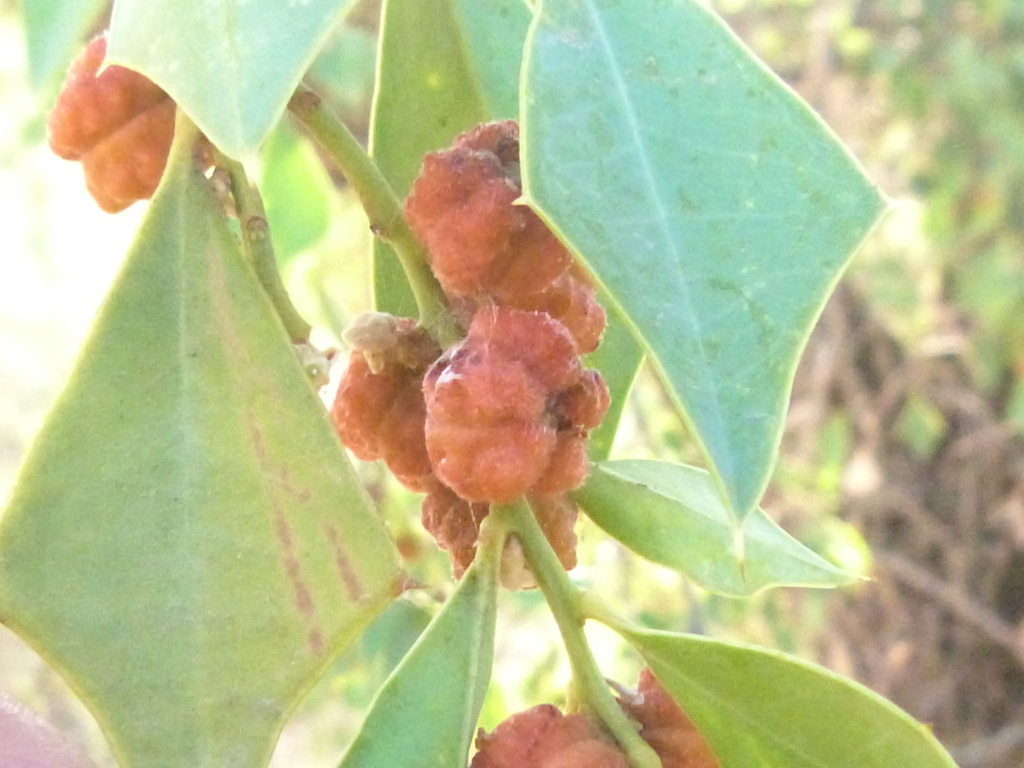

Scientific classification
- Kingdom: Plantae
- Clade: Tracheophytes
- Clade: Angiosperms
- Clade: Eudicots
- Order: Santalales
- Family: Santalaceae
- Genus: Jodina; Hook. & Arn. ex Meisn.

= Jodina =

Genus of plants

Jodina is a genus of flowering plants belonging to the family Santalaceae.

Its native range is Bolivia to Southern Brazil and Southern South America.

Species:

- Jodina rhombifolia (Hook. & Arn.) Reissek
