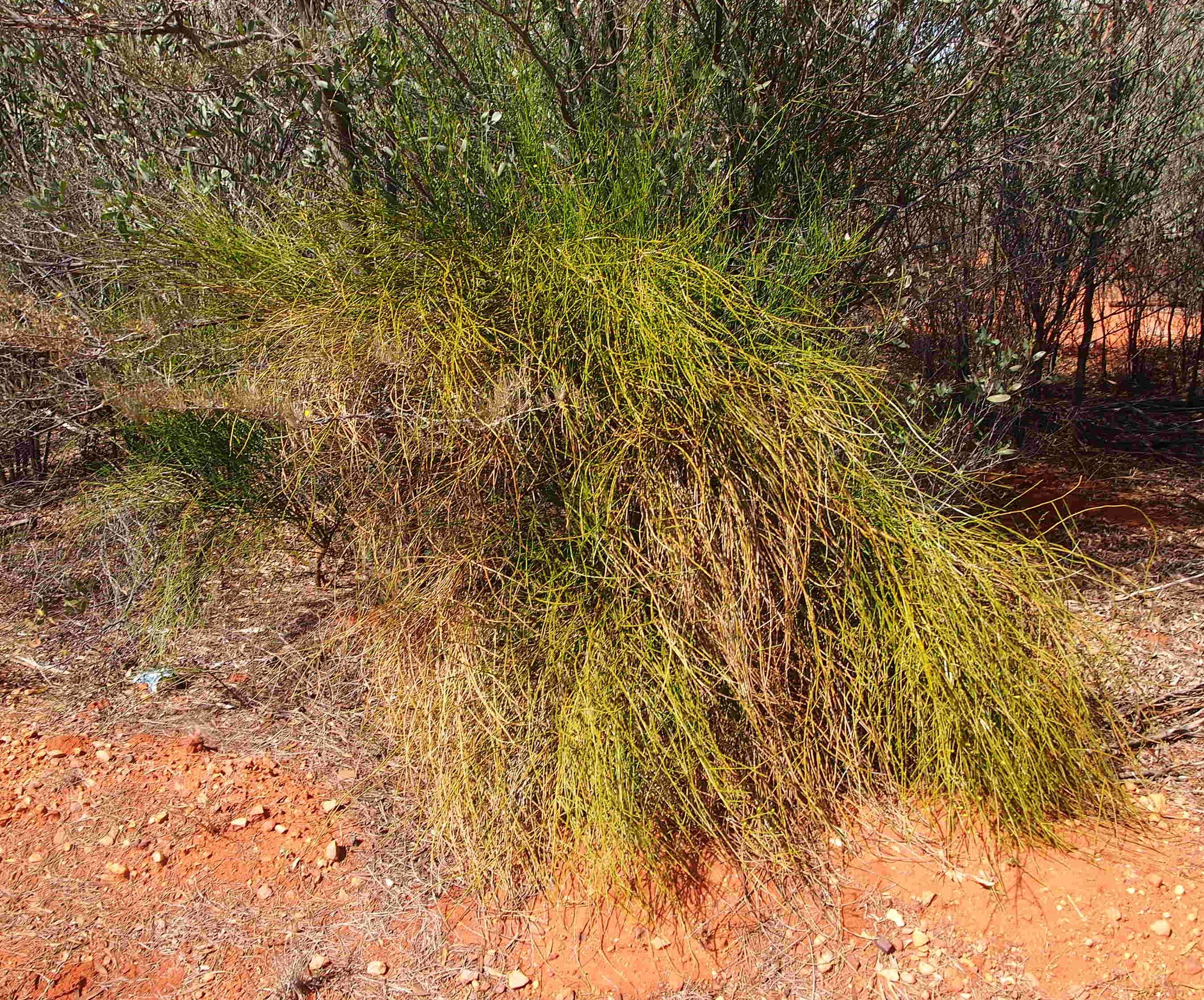
- Anthobolus leptomerioides

Scientific classification
- Kingdom: Plantae
- Clade: Tracheophytes
- Clade: Angiosperms
- Clade: Eudicots
- Order: Santalales
- Family: Opiliaceae
- Genus: Anthobolus; R.Br.

Species
- See text.

= Anthobolus =

Genus of flowering plants in the sandalwood family

Anthobolus is a genus of flowering shrubs in the sandalwood family, Santalaceae. The genus comprises 3 species, all endemic to Australia. They are dioecious, with male and female flowers on separate plants.

They are semi-parasitic, requiring the roots of a host tree, a trait they share with many other members of the Santalaceae.

The cladistics of this genus is controversial. It has traditionally been included within the Santalaceae, however genetic analyses have led some authors to include it within the Opiliaceae, a move that has been disputed by later authors due to a lack of any shared characteristics with the other members of the Opiliaceae.

== Anthobolus species ==
- Anthobolus erythrocaulis F.Muell.
- Anthobolus foveolatus F.Muell.
- Anthobolus filifolius R.Br.
- Anthobolus leptomerioides F.Muell.
