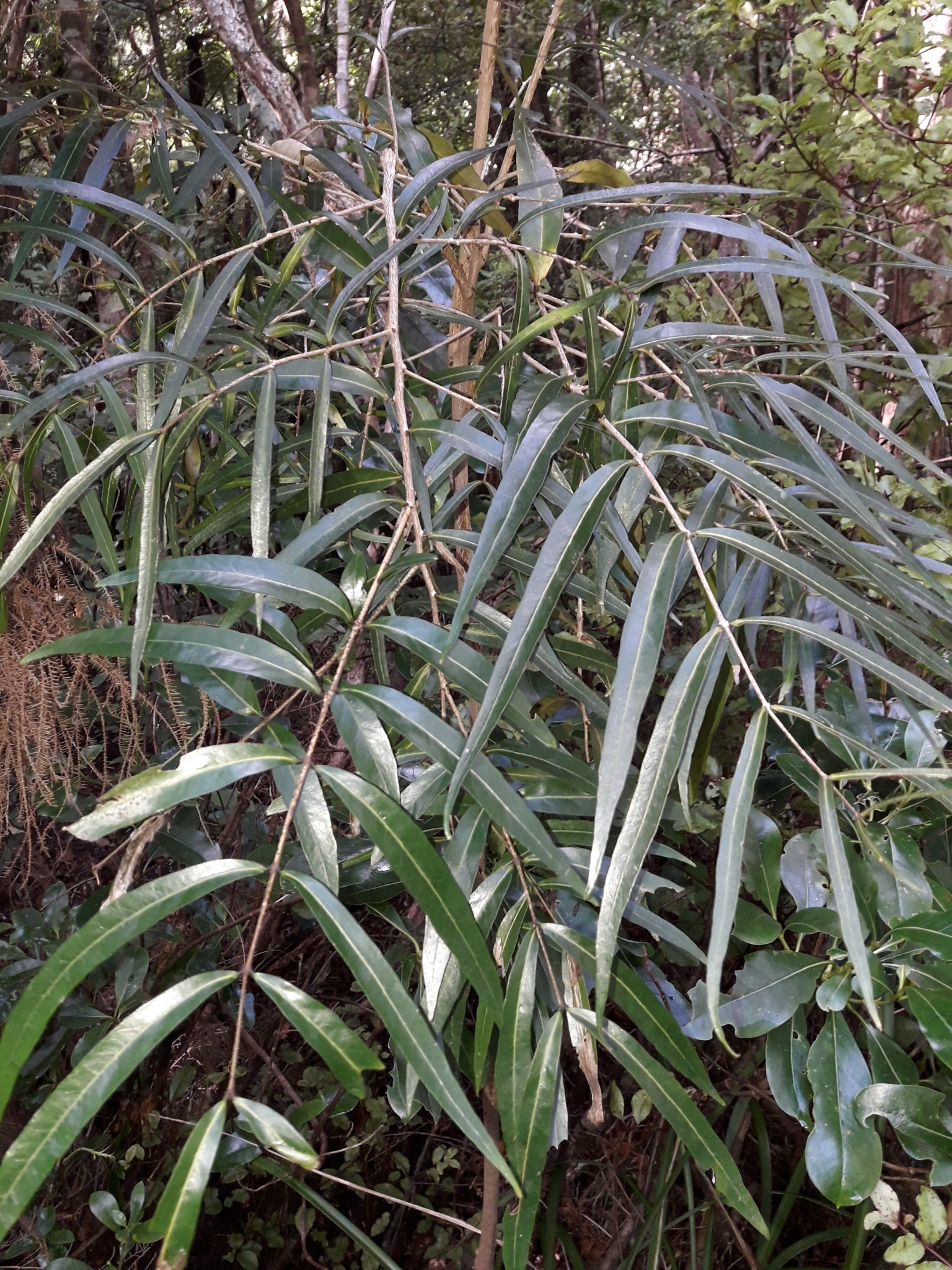
- Mida salicifolia seen in the Coromandel Peninsula

Scientific classification
- Kingdom: Plantae
- Clade: Embryophytes
- Clade: Tracheophytes
- Clade: Spermatophytes
- Clade: Angiosperms
- Clade: Eudicots
- Order: Santalales
- Family: Santalaceae
- Genus: Mida; R.Cunn. ex A.Cunn. (1838)
- Species: M. salicifolia

Binomial name
- Mida salicifolia A.Cunn. (1838)

Synonyms
- Fusanus cunninghamii Benth. & Hook.f. ex Kirk (1889), nom. superfl.; Fusanus eucalyptoides (A.Cunn.) Druce (1916 publ. 1917); Mida cunninghamii Chatin (1859); Mida eucalyptoides A.Cunn. (1838); Mida myrtifolia A.Cunn. (1838); Mida undulata Colenso (1844); Santalum cunninghamii Hook.f. (1853), nom. superfl.; Santalum mida Hook. (1843), nom. superfl.; Santalum salicifolium (A.Cunn.) Meurisse (1892)

= Mida salicifolia =

Species of plant

Mida salicifolia is a species of flowering plant in the family Santalaceae. It is a tree endemic to the North Island of New Zealand. It is the sole species in genus Mida.

== Habitat ==
Mida salicifolia grows in kauri forests, as it can use the tree as a host. It is rarely found south of Auckland.

== Gallery ==
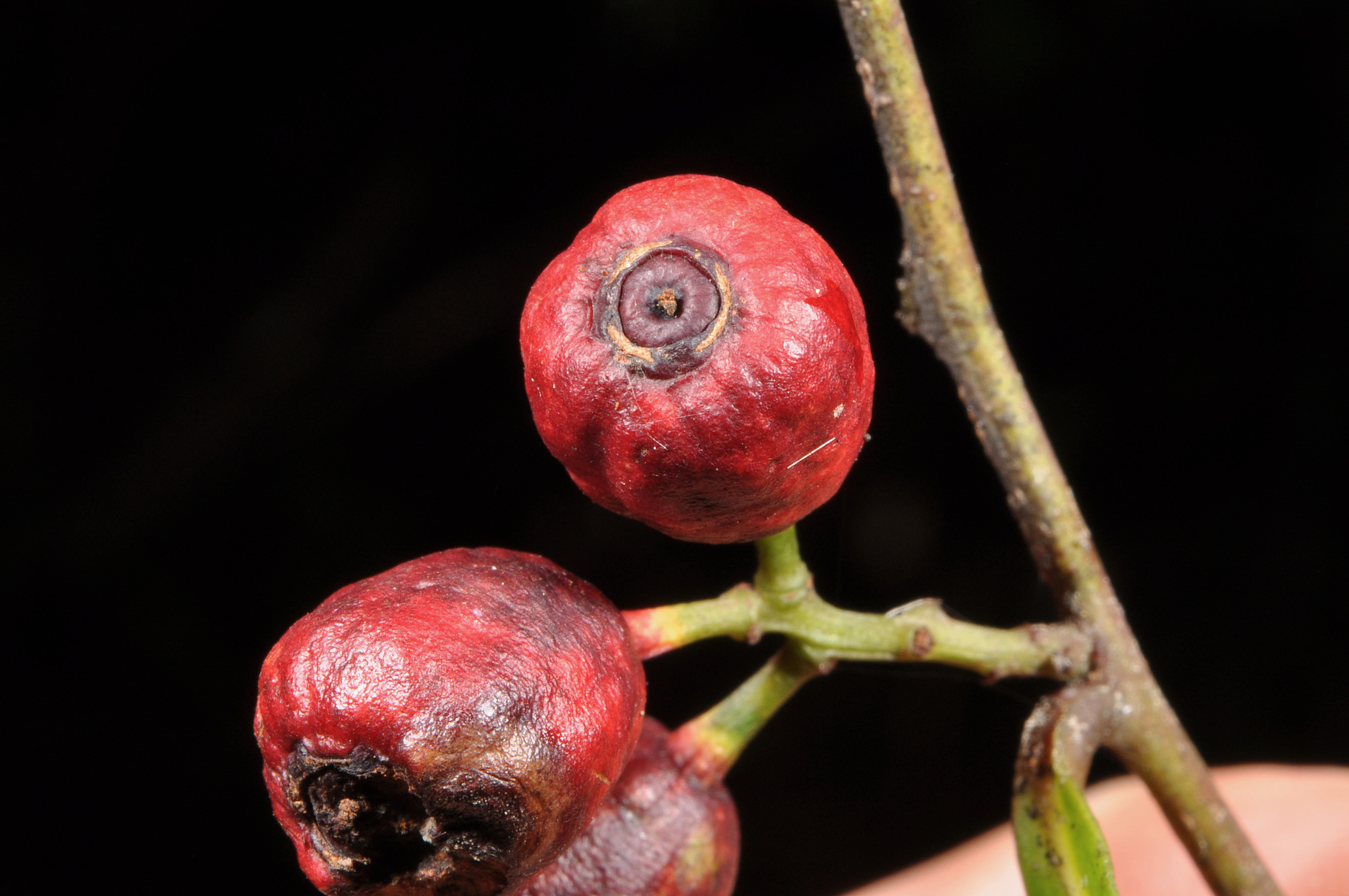
Fruit of Mida salicifolia

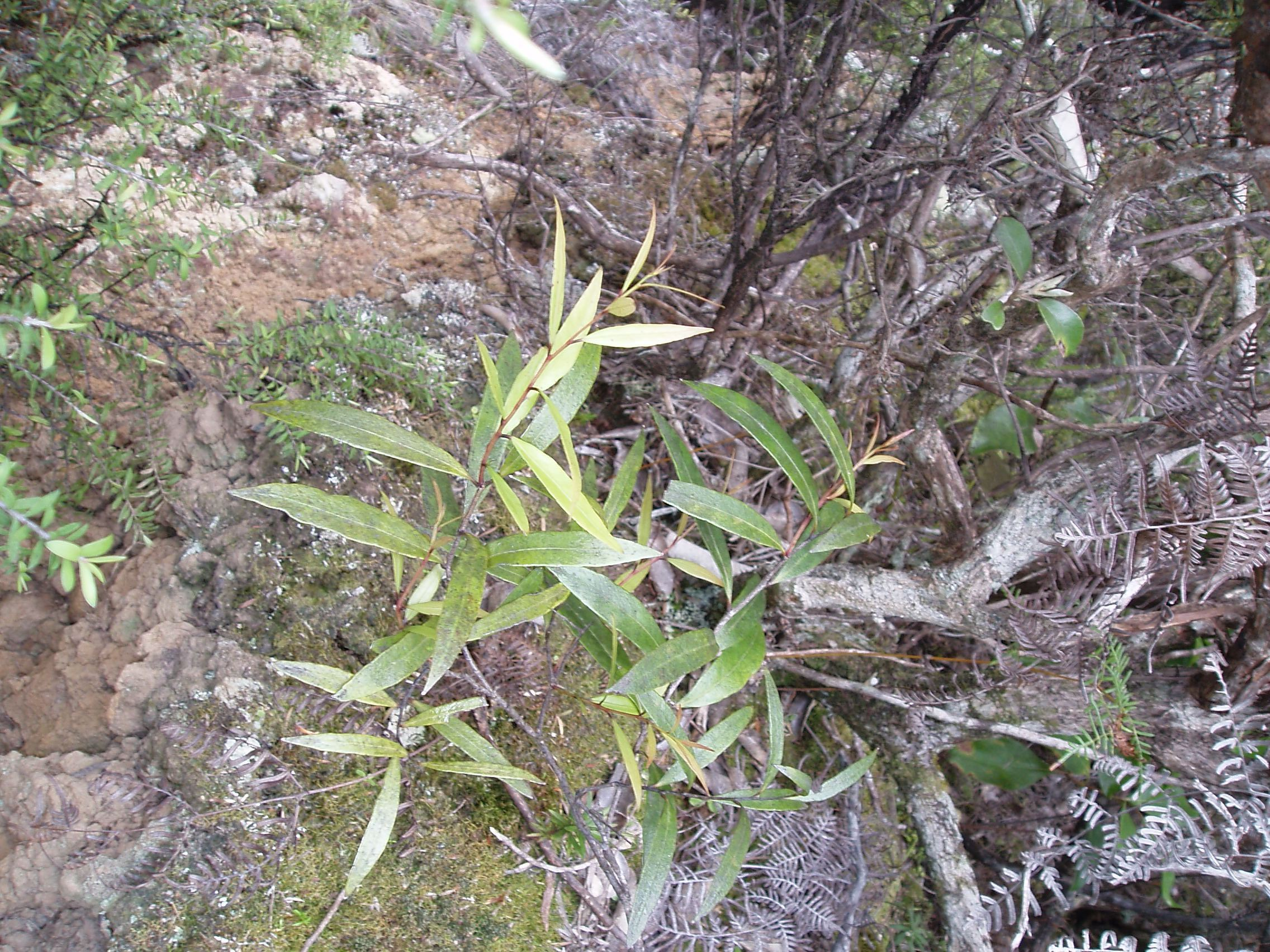
Mida salicifolia seen in the Coromandel Peninsula

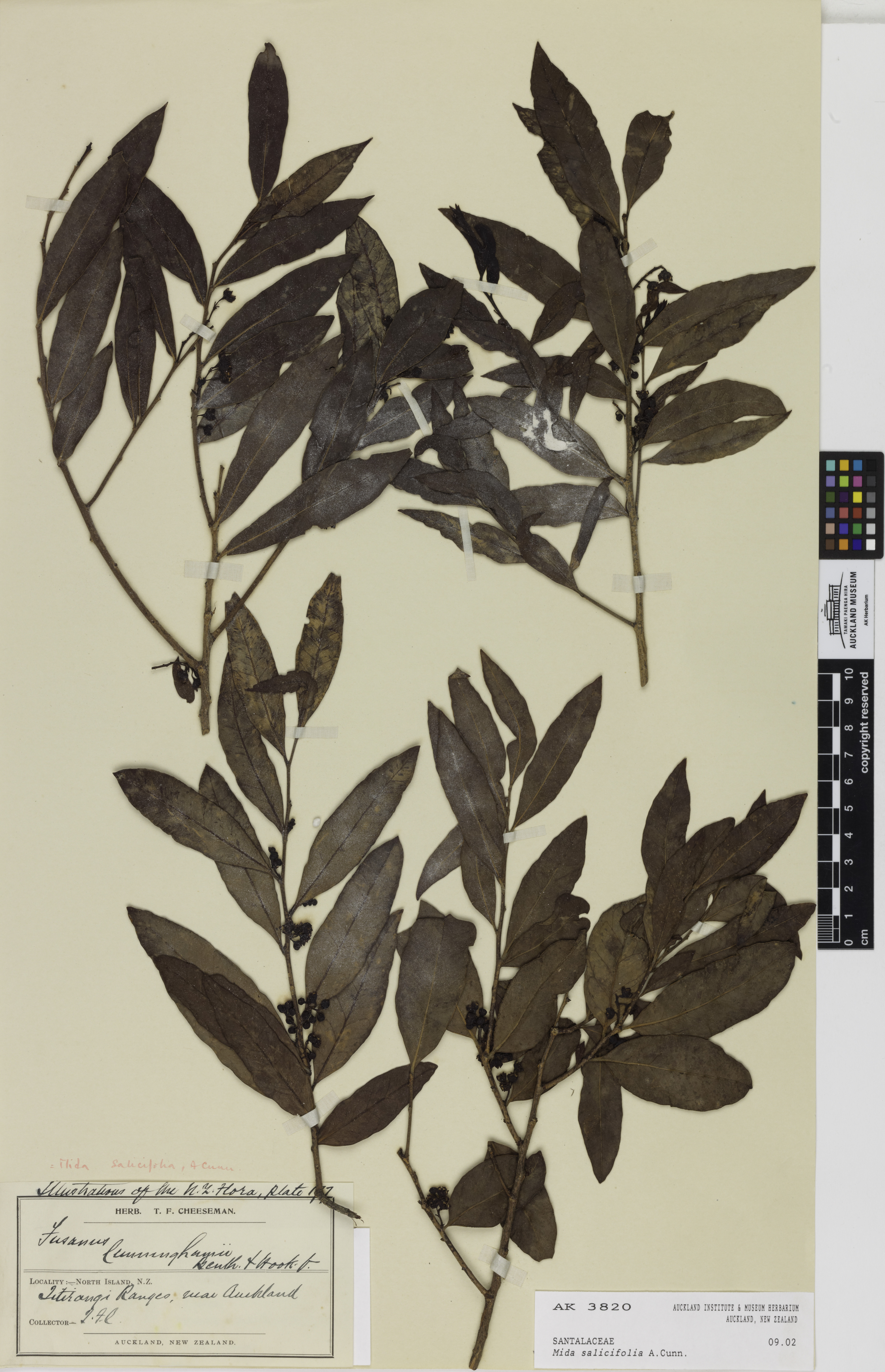
Type specimen from the herbarium of Auckland War Memorial Museum
