= Dufrenoya =

Scientific classification
- Kingdom: Plantae
- Clade: Tracheophytes
- Clade: Angiosperms
- Clade: Eudicots
- Order: Santalales
- Family: Santalaceae
- Genus: Dufrenoya; Chatin

Synonyms
- Hylomyza Danser

Genus of flowering plants

Dufrenoya is a genus of flowering plants in the family Santalaceae. It includes 13 species which range from the Himalayas to south-central China, Indochina, and western Malesia.

- Dufrenoya aurantiaca Stauffer
- Dufrenoya collettii (Gamble) Stauffer
- Dufrenoya euryphylla (Danser) Stauffer
- Dufrenoya granulata (Hook.f. & Thomson ex A.DC.) Stauffer
- Dufrenoya longicuneata Stauffer
- Dufrenoya oresitropha (Danser) Stauffer
- Dufrenoya papillosa Stauffer
- Dufrenoya platyphylla (Spreng.) Stauffer
- Dufrenoya poilanei Stauffer
- Dufrenoya pruinosa Stauffer
- Dufrenoya robusta Stauffer
- Dufrenoya sessilis (Craib) Stauffer
- Dufrenoya sphaerocarpa (Danser) Stauffer
