= Pilgerina =

Conservation status
- Near Threatened (IUCN 3.1)

Scientific classification
- Kingdom: Plantae
- Clade: Tracheophytes
- Clade: Angiosperms
- Clade: Eudicots
- Order: Santalales
- Family: Santalaceae
- Genus: Pilgerina; Z.S.Rogers, Nickrent & Malécot
- Species: P. madagascariensis

Binomial name
- Pilgerina madagascariensis Z.S.Rogers, Nickrent & Malécot

Genus of plants

Pilgerina is a monotypic genus of flowering plants belonging to the family Santalaceae. It only contains one known species, Pilgerina madagascariensis.

It is native to Madagascar, where it is known as sakaimboalavo.

== Description ==
Pilgerina madagascariensis is a shrub or small tree. It flowers from October to January, and fruits from November to April.

== Range and habitat ==
Pilgerina madagascariensis is distributed widely in Madagascar. There are ten known subpopulations, in the former provinces of Antsiranana, Fianarantsoa, Toamasina and Toliara. The estimated extent of occurrence (EOO) is 224,809 km^{2}, and the estimated area of occupancy (AOO) is 108 km^{2}.

The species is found in dry, subarid, humid, subhumid, and littoral forests between sea level and 1,499 meters elevation. It grows on sandy, sandstone, and calcareous substrates.

There are 10 known subpopulations of this species. The last recent collection was done in 2012 at Ste Luce (Anosy region).

== Conservation and threats ==
The species is threatened with habitat loss, and has a declining population. Seven of the ten populations are now in protected areas. The three unprotected populations are threatened by continuing deforestation from mining, wildfire, and logging. The species' conservation status is assessed as endangered.

== Name ==
The genus name of Pilgerina is in honour of Robert Knud Friedrich Pilger (1876–1953), a German botanist, who specialised in the study of conifers. The Latin specific epithet of madagascariensis means "coming from Madagascar. Both the genus and the species were first described and published in Ann. Missouri Bot. Gard. Vol.95 on page 398–399 in 2008.
