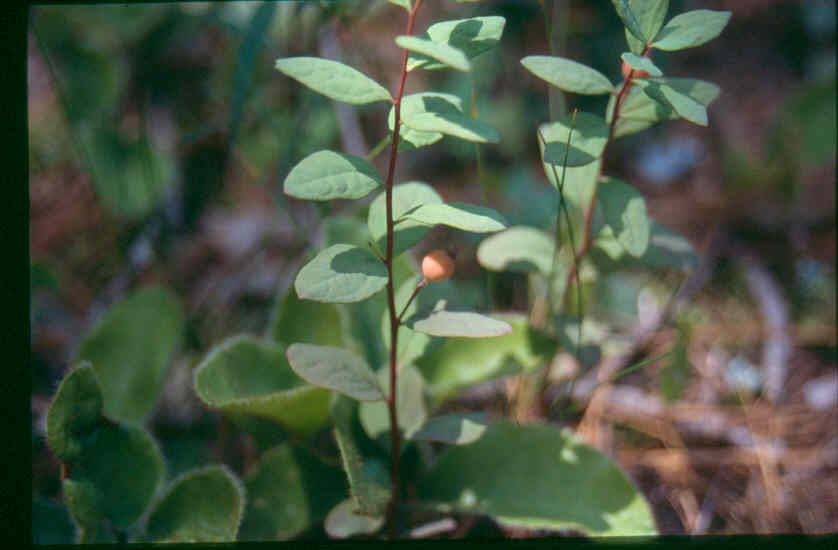

Conservation status
- Secure (NatureServe)

Scientific classification
- Kingdom: Plantae
- Clade: Tracheophytes
- Clade: Angiosperms
- Clade: Eudicots
- Order: Santalales
- Family: Santalaceae
- Genus: Geocaulon; Fernald
- Species: G. lividum

Binomial name
- Geocaulon lividum (Richardson) Fernald

= Geocaulon =

Species of flowering plant in the mistletoe family

Geocaulon is a monotypic genus of flowering plants in the family Santalaceae containing the single species Geocaulon lividum, which is known by the common names northern comandra and false toadflax. It is native to northern North America, where it is common and widespread from Alaska to Newfoundland and into the northernmost contiguous United States.

This plant is a perennial herb which grows from rhizomes located in the humus. It produces stems up to 30 centimetres (12 inches) tall and inflorescences with two or three greenish or purplish flowers, one of which is generally perfect while the others are male. The fruit is an orange drupe containing one seed. This plant grows as a hemiparasite on other species. It produces haustoria which tap the roots of host plants such as spruce, pine, birch, willow, alder, and twinflower.

This plant grows in many types of moist boreal habitat. It occurs in many types of coniferous and deciduous forests, bogs, and other wetlands. It is found in spruce forests on the taiga of Alaska and it is an indicator of continental boreal and cool temperate climate in British Columbia. It is found alongside plant species such as American green alder (Alnus viridis ssp. crispa), bog Labrador tea (Ledum groenlandicum), bearberry (Arctostaphylos uva-ursi), crowberry (Empetrum nigrum), twinflower (Linnaea borealis), prickly rose (Rosa acicularis), mountain cranberry (Vaccinium vitis-idaea), bog blueberry (Vaccinium uliginosum), highbush cranberry (Viburnum edule), bunchberry (Cornus canadensis), one-sided wintergreen (Orthilia secunda), bluejoint reedgrass (Calamagrostis canadensis), horsetails (Equisetum spp.), feathermosses (Hylocomium splendens and Pleurozium schreberi), and lichens (Cladonia spp. and Peltigera aphthosa).
