= Alloneuron ecuadorense =

Conservation status
- Vulnerable (IUCN 3.1)

Scientific classification
- Kingdom: Plantae
- Clade: Tracheophytes
- Clade: Angiosperms
- Clade: Eudicots
- Clade: Rosids
- Order: Myrtales
- Family: Melastomataceae
- Genus: Alloneuron
- Species: A. ecuadorense

Binomial name
- Alloneuron ecuadorense Wurdack

Species of flowering plant

Alloneuron ecuadorense is a species of plant in the family Melastomataceae. It is endemic to Ecuador. Its natural habitat is subtropical or tropical moist montane forests.
