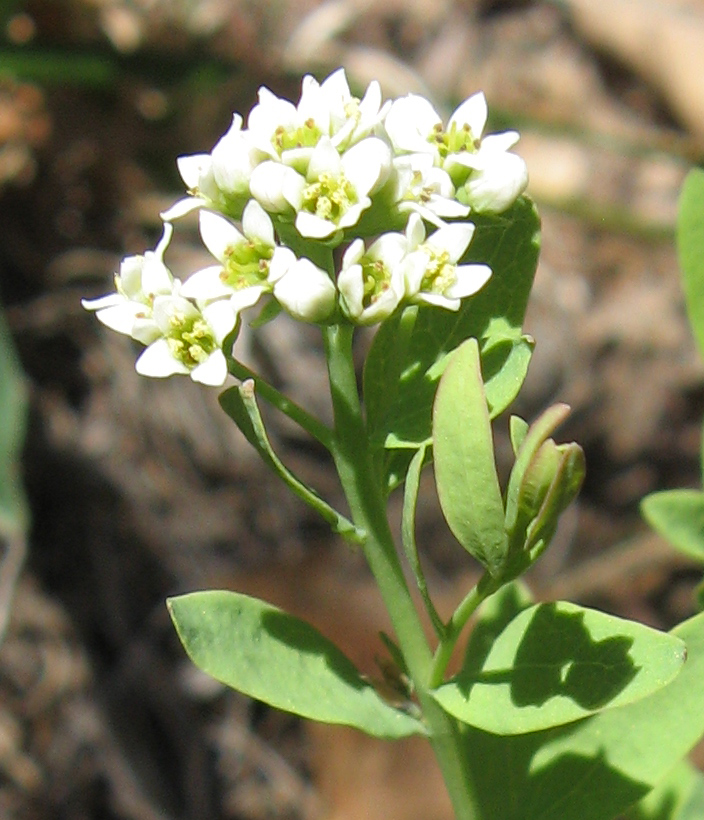

Conservation status
- Secure (NatureServe)

Scientific classification
- Kingdom: Plantae
- Clade: Tracheophytes
- Clade: Angiosperms
- Clade: Eudicots
- Order: Santalales
- Family: Santalaceae
- Genus: Comandra; Nutt.
- Species: C. umbellata

Binomial name
- Comandra umbellata (L.) Nutt.

Synonyms
- Comandra richardsiana Fern.; Thesium umbellatum L.; Comandra umbellata subsp. elegans (Rochel ex Rchb.) Piehl; Comandra elegans (Rochel ex Rchb.) Rchb. f, 1849; Comandra pallida A. DC.

= Comandra =

Species of flowering plant in the mistletoe family

Comandra is a monotypic genus containing the single species Comandra umbellata. Its common names include bastard toadflax, umbellate bastard toadflax, and common comandra. The plant has a disjunct distribution; its four subspecies occur in North America and the Mediterranean.

== Description ==
Comandra is a perennial herb growing from rhizomes, often in drier or semi-sandy soils, to about 8 to 34 centimetres (3 1/4 to 13 1/2 in) tall. The leaves are up to 3.3 cm long and are alternately arranged. Growing in flat or roundish clusters, the flowers lack petals, but have five greenish-white sepals. The flowers contain both male and female structures, and are insect-pollinated. The fruit is a drupe 4–6 mm thick.

Subspecies include:

- Comandra umbellata subsp. californica – California bastard toadflax
- Comandra umbellata subsp. pallida – pale bastard toadflax, pine bastard toadflax
- Comandra umbellata subsp. umbellata

Comandra umbellata is hemiparasitic; it is not holoparasitic as it obtains some nutrition through photosynthesis. It has a wide host range, parasitizing over 200 known plant species. These include: Acer, Antennaria, Aster, Betula, Carex, Solidago, Fragaria, Populus, Quercus, Rosa, Rubus, Vaccinium and some grasses.

In Europe the common English name bastard toadflax is used for plants of the genus Thesium.

== Pathogens ==
Comandra umbellata is the alternate host for the comandra blister rust (Cronartium comandrae), a rust fungus that affects pine species in North America. Comandra blister rust can cause tree losses of up to 7% in some regions where it is common.

When C. umbellata is infected by the rust aeciospores from the pine host, yellow, blister-like spots bearing urediniospores appear on the leaves of the plant within 20 days. In the following weeks, teliospores develop on brown, hairlike telia that germinate to produce basidiospores, the fungal life stage capable of infecting pines.

== Uses ==
A decoction of the plant parts was made by the Navajo people for narcotic and other medicinal usage. In times of food shortage, the berries were used by Native Americans as a food source, and though small, they have a sweet taste. The fruit may contain toxic selenium if grown in soil rich in the element.
