= Amphorogyne =

Scientific classification
- Kingdom: Plantae
- Clade: Tracheophytes
- Clade: Angiosperms
- Clade: Eudicots
- Order: Santalales
- Family: Santalaceae
- Genus: Amphorogyne; Stauffer & Hurlim.

Genus of flowering plant in the mistletoe family

Amphorogyne is a genus of hemiparasitic trees and shrubs in the family Santalaceae. The genus is endemic to New Caledonia in the Pacific and contains three species. Its closest relative is Daenikera, also endemic to New Caledonia.

== List of species ==
- Amphorogyne celastroides Stauffer & Hürl.
- Amphorogyne spicata Stauffer & Hürl.
- Amphorogyne staufferi Markgraf
