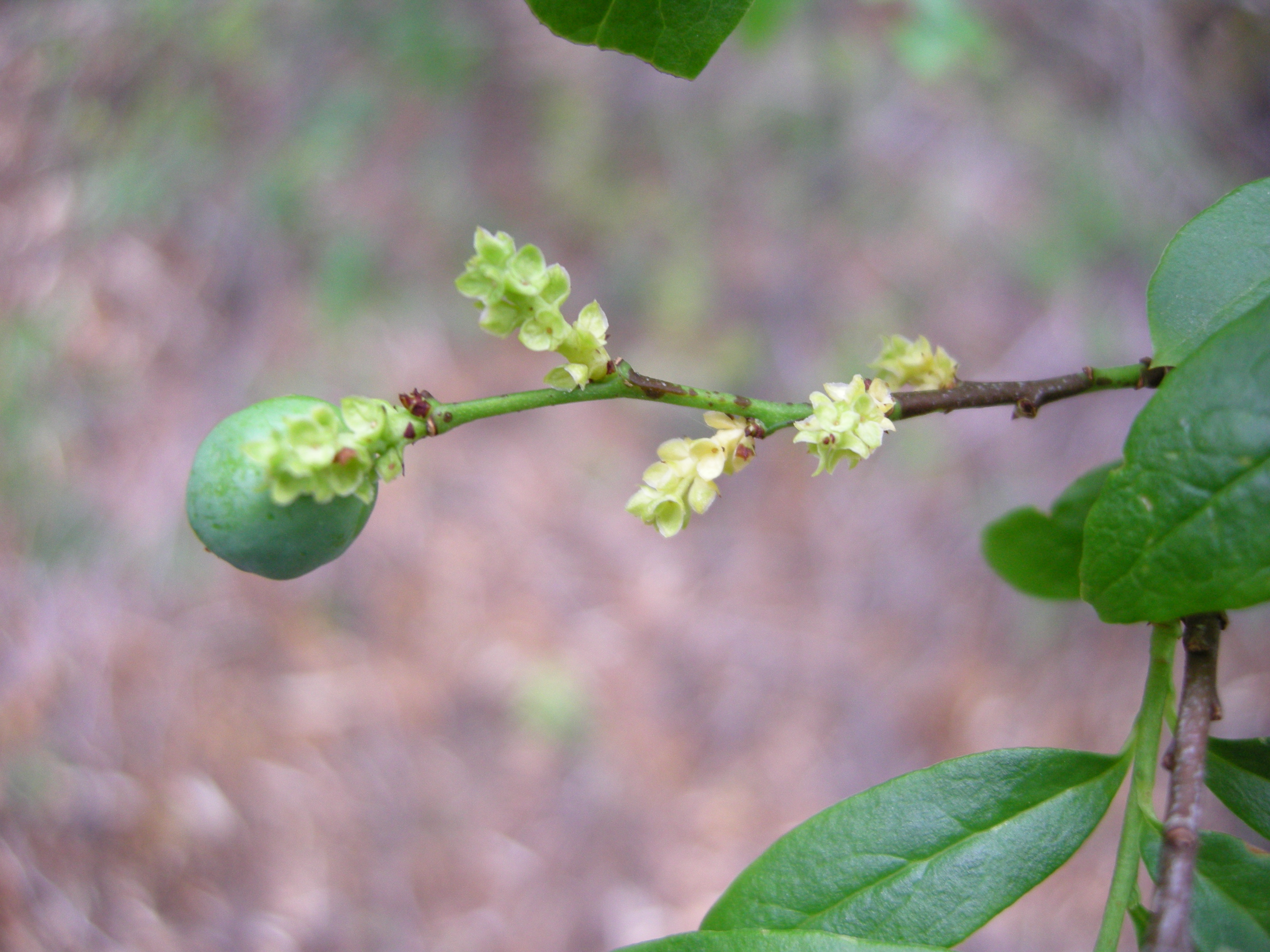

Scientific classification
- Kingdom: Plantae
- Clade: Tracheophytes
- Clade: Angiosperms
- Clade: Eudicots
- Order: Santalales
- Family: Santalaceae
- Genus: Myoschilos; Ruiz & Pav.
- Species: M. oblongus

Binomial name
- Myoschilos oblongus Ruiz & Pav.

= Myoschilos =

Myoschilos oblongus

Genus of plants

Myoschilos is a genus of flowering plants in the family Santalaceae. It is monotypic, being represented by the single species Myoschilos oblongus which is native to southern South America.
