= Robert Knud Friedrich Pilger =

Late 19th century German botanist

Robert Knud Friedrich Pilger (3 July 1876, Helgoland – 1 September 1953, Berlin) was a German botanist, who specialised in the study of conifers.

He collected plants in the Mato Grosso of Brazil, and from 1945 to 1950 was director of the botanical garden at Berlin-Dahlem.

The genera; Pilgerodendron Florin (Cupressaceae), Pilgerina Z.S.Rogers, Nickrent & Malécot (family Santalaceae), and Pilgerochloa Eig (Poaceae) are all named in his honour.

== Selected bibliography ==
- Pilger, R. (1926). Phylogenie und Systematik der Coniferae. In: Engler, A., & Prantl, K. A. E. (eds.). Die natürlichen Pflanzenfamilien XIII. Leipzig.
- Pilger, R. (1926). Pinaceae. In: Urban, I. (ed.). Plantae Haitienses III. Ark. Bot. 20 (4): A15: 9–10.
- Pilger, R. (1931). Die Gattung Juniperus L. Mitt. Deutsch. Dendrol. Ges. 43: 255–269.
