= Phacellaria =

Scientific classification
- Kingdom: Plantae
- Clade: Embryophytes
- Clade: Tracheophytes
- Clade: Angiosperms
- Clade: Eudicots
- Order: Santalales
- Family: Santalaceae
- Genus: Phacellaria; Benth.

Genus of plants

Phacellaria is a genus of flowering plants belonging to the family Santalaceae.

Its native range is Assam to Southern China and Peninsular Malaysia.

== Species ==
Species:

- Phacellaria caulescens Collett & Hemsl.
- Phacellaria compressa Benth.
- Phacellaria fargesii Lecomte
- Phacellaria malayana Ridl.
- Phacellaria rigidula Benth.
- Phacellaria tonkinensis Lecomte
