= Wurdastom =

Scientific classification
- Kingdom: Plantae
- Clade: Tracheophytes
- Clade: Angiosperms
- Clade: Eudicots
- Clade: Rosids
- Order: Myrtales
- Family: Melastomataceae
- Genus: Wurdastom; B.Walln.

Genus of flowering plants

Wurdastom is a genus of flowering plants belonging to the family Melastomataceae.

It is native to Colombia, Ecuador and Peru in western South America.

== Known species ==
There are 8 accepted species by Plants of the World Online (as of Jan. 2022):

- Wurdastom bullata (Wurdack) B.Walln.
- Wurdastom cuatrecasasii (Wurdack) B.Walln.
- Wurdastom dorrii (Wurdack) B.Walln.
- Wurdastom dudleyi (Wurdack) B.Walln.
- Wurdastom ecuadorensis (Wurdack) B.Walln.
- Wurdastom hexamera (Wurdack) B.Walln.
- Wurdastom sneidernii (Wurdack) B.Walln.
- Wurdastom subglabra (Wurdack) B.Walln.

== Taxonomy ==
The genus name of Wurdastom is in honour of John Julius Wurdack (1921–1998), an American botanist at the New York Botanical Garden and also the Smithsonian Institution. It was first described and published in Ann. Naturhist. Mus. Wien, B 98 (Suppl.) on page 461 in 1996.
