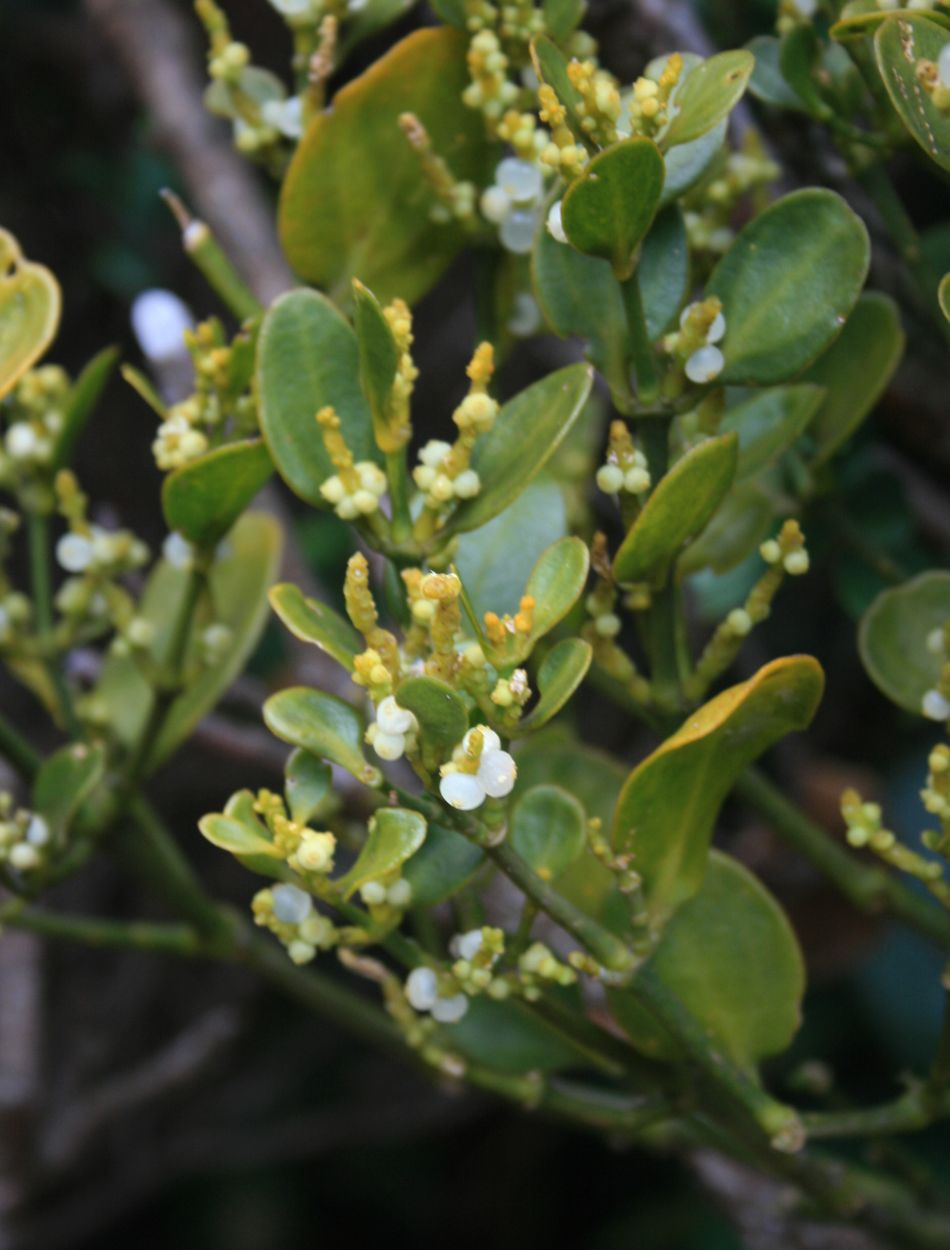
- Dendrophthora costaricensis

Scientific classification
- Kingdom: Plantae
- Clade: Tracheophytes
- Clade: Angiosperms
- Clade: Eudicots
- Order: Santalales
- Family: Santalaceae
- Tribe: Visceae
- Genus: Dendrophthora; Eichler

Species
- See text

Synonyms
- Distichella Tiegh.

= Dendrophthora =

Genus of mistletoes

Dendrophthora, the tree destroyers, is a genus of flowering plants in the sandalwood family Santalaceae, native to tropical and subtropical Latin America and the Caribbean. They are hemiparasitic mistletoes that grow on a wide variety of host plants.

== Species ==
Currently accepted species include:

- Dendrophthora albescens Urb. & Ekman
- Dendrophthora amalfiensis Kuijt
- Dendrophthora ambigua Kuijt
- Dendrophthora arcuata C.Wright
- Dendrophthora argentea Kuijt
- Dendrophthora avenia (Trel.) Kuijt
- Dendrophthora bermejae Kuijt, Carlo & Aukema
- Dendrophthora bonaniae (Griseb.) Eichler
- Dendrophthora brachylepis Urb.
- Dendrophthora brachystachya Urb.
- Dendrophthora bulbifera Kuijt
- Dendrophthora buxifolia (Lam.) Eichler
- Dendrophthora capillaris Kuijt
- Dendrophthora capitellata Rizzini
- Dendrophthora carnosa Urb. & Ekman
- Dendrophthora chrysostachya (C.Presl) Urb.
- Dendrophthora clavata (Benth.) Urb.
- Dendrophthora confertiflora Krug & Urb.
- Dendrophthora constricta (Griseb.) Eichler
- Dendrophthora corynarthron (Eichler) Kuijt
- Dendrophthora costaricensis Urb.
- Dendrophthora crispula (Rizzini) Kuijt
- Dendrophthora cryptantha Kuijt
- Dendrophthora cubensis Eichler
- Dendrophthora cuneifolia Kuijt
- Dendrophthora cupressoides (Griseb.) Eichler
- Dendrophthora cupulata (DC.) Eichler
- Dendrophthora dalstroemii Kuijt
- Dendrophthora davidsei Kuijt
- Dendrophthora decipiens Kuijt
- Dendrophthora densifolia Kuijt
- Dendrophthora densifrons (Ule) Kuijt
- Dendrophthora diffusa Kuijt
- Dendrophthora dimorpha Kuijt
- Dendrophthora dittae Urb. & Ekman
- Dendrophthora dodsonii Kuijt
- Dendrophthora domingensis (Spreng.) Eichler
- Dendrophthora eichleriana Urb.
- Dendrophthora elegantissima Kuijt
- Dendrophthora elliptica (Gardner) Krug & Urb.
- Dendrophthora enckeifolia (Rizzini) Kuijt
- Dendrophthora epiviscum (Griseb.) Eichler
- Dendrophthora equisetoides Kuijt
- Dendrophthora erythrantha Kuijt
- Dendrophthora excisa Urb.
- Dendrophthora fanshawei (Maguire) Kuijt
- Dendrophthora fasciculata Pacz.
- Dendrophthora fastigiata Kuijt
- Dendrophthora fendleriana (Eichler) Kuijt
- Dendrophthora ferruginea Pacz.
- Dendrophthora filiformis Rizzini
- Dendrophthora flagelliformis (Lam.) Krug & Urb.
- Dendrophthora fortis Kuijt
- Dendrophthora glauca (C.Wright ex Griseb.) Eichler
- Dendrophthora gracilipes Kuijt
- Dendrophthora grandifolia Eichler
- Dendrophthora haberi Kuijt
- Dendrophthora harlingii Kuijt
- Dendrophthora heterophylla (Rizzini) Kuijt
- Dendrophthora hexasticha Tiegh.
- Dendrophthora intermedia (Rizzini) Kuijt
- Dendrophthora jauana Rizzini
- Dendrophthora lamprophylla (Urb.) Urb.
- Dendrophthora lanceifolia Urb.
- Dendrophthora lanceolata Kuijt
- Dendrophthora laxiflora Urb.
- Dendrophthora leucocarpa (Pacz.) Trel.
- Dendrophthora lindeniana Tiegh.
- Dendrophthora linearifolia Pacz.
- Dendrophthora longipedunculata Rizzini
- Dendrophthora lueri Kuijt
- Dendrophthora macbridei (Standl.) Kuijt
- Dendrophthora macrostachyos (Jacq.) Eichler
- Dendrophthora mancinellae (C.Wright ex Griseb.) Eichler
- Dendrophthora marmeladensis Urb.
- Dendrophthora meridana Kuijt
- Dendrophthora mesembrianthemifolia Urb.
- Dendrophthora mexicana Kuijt
- Dendrophthora microphylla Kuijt
- Dendrophthora microsoma Rizzini
- Dendrophthora mirandensis Kuijt
- Dendrophthora mornicola Urb.
- Dendrophthora negeriana Pacz.
- Dendrophthora nitidula (Rizzini) Kuijt
- Dendrophthora nodosa Pacz.
- Dendrophthora nuda Proctor
- Dendrophthora obliqua (C.Presl) Wiens
- Dendrophthora oligantha Kuijt
- Dendrophthora opuntioides (L.) Eichler
- Dendrophthora ovata Kuijt
- Dendrophthora palaeformis Kuijt
- Dendrophthora panamensis Kuijt
- Dendrophthora paucifolia (Rusby) Kuijt
- Dendrophthora pavonii Tiegh.
- Dendrophthora pearcei (Rusby) Kuijt
- Dendrophthora perfurcata (Rizzini) Kuijt
- Dendrophthora perlicarpa Kuijt
- Dendrophthora peruviana Kuijt
- Dendrophthora polyantha Kuijt
- Dendrophthora primaria Kuijt
- Dendrophthora purpurea Kuijt
- Dendrophthora ramosa Pacz.
- Dendrophthora remotiflora Urb.
- Dendrophthora roraimae (Oliv.) Ule
- Dendrophthora roseantha Kuijt
- Dendrophthora rotundata Kuijt
- Dendrophthora scopulata Kuijt
- Dendrophthora serpyllifolia (Griseb.) Krug & Urb.
- Dendrophthora sessilifolia (Griseb.) Krug & Urb.
- Dendrophthora solomonis Kuijt
- Dendrophthora squamigera (Benth.) Benth. & Hook.f. ex Kuntze
- Dendrophthora steyermarkii Rizzini
- Dendrophthora stricta Rusby
- Dendrophthora subsessilis Kuijt
- Dendrophthora subtrinervis Urb.
- Dendrophthora sulcata Kuijt
- Dendrophthora sumacoi Kuijt
- Dendrophthora talamancana Kuijt
- Dendrophthora tenuiflora (Steyerm. & Maguire) Kuijt
- Dendrophthora tenuifolia Kuijt
- Dendrophthora tenuis Kuijt
- Dendrophthora terminalis Kuijt
- Dendrophthora ternata Urb.
- Dendrophthora tetrastachya (Griseb.) Urb.
- Dendrophthora thomasii Kuijt
- Dendrophthora turrialbae Kuijt
- Dendrophthora urbaniana Pacz.
- Dendrophthora variabilis Kuijt
- Dendrophthora verrucosa Kuijt
- Dendrophthora virgata (Trel.) Kuijt
- Dendrophthora warmingii (Eichler) Kuijt
- Dendrophthora werffii Kuijt
