= Eubrachion =

Scientific classification
- Kingdom: Plantae
- Clade: Tracheophytes
- Clade: Angiosperms
- Clade: Eudicots
- Order: Santalales
- Family: Santalaceae
- Genus: Eubrachion

Genus of plants

Eubrachion is a genus of flowering plants belonging to the family Santalaceae.

Its native range is Caribbean to Southern Tropical America.

Species:

- Eubrachion ambiguum (Hook. & Arn.) Engl.
- Eubrachion gracile Kuijt
