= Nestronia =

Conservation status
- Apparently Secure (NatureServe)

Scientific classification
- Kingdom: Plantae
- Clade: Tracheophytes
- Clade: Angiosperms
- Clade: Eudicots
- Order: Santalales
- Family: Santalaceae
- Genus: Nestronia; Raf.
- Species: N. umbellula

Binomial name
- Nestronia umbellula Rafinesque

Species of flowering plant in the mistletoe family

Nestronia is a monotypic genus of flowering plants in the family Santalaceae containing the single species Nestronia umbellula. This plant which is known by the common names leechbrush, nestronia, conjurer's-nut, and Indian olive. A native to the piedmont of the southeastern United States, it usually occurs in isolated clonal colonies of all male or all female plants.

A rare small rhizomatous shrub, Nestronia is a hemiparasite on the roots of oaks and other hardwoods, as well as pines. Generally less than 1 meter (3 ft 3 in) tall, Nestronia has opposite leaves and branches, with inconspicuous yellow-green flowers having 4 or 5 petal-like sepals. The rare fruit is a yellow drupe containing one seed.

Nestronia, or physic-nut, is described growing in Georgia in Bartram's Travels. Bartram states that when “the Indians go in pursuit of deer, they carry this fruit with them, because it is supposed to carry the power of charming the animal to them”. Fruiting was perhaps more common in this species in Bartram's day than today. The once-common co-occurrence of male and female plant colonies is now threatened due to habitat loss.
