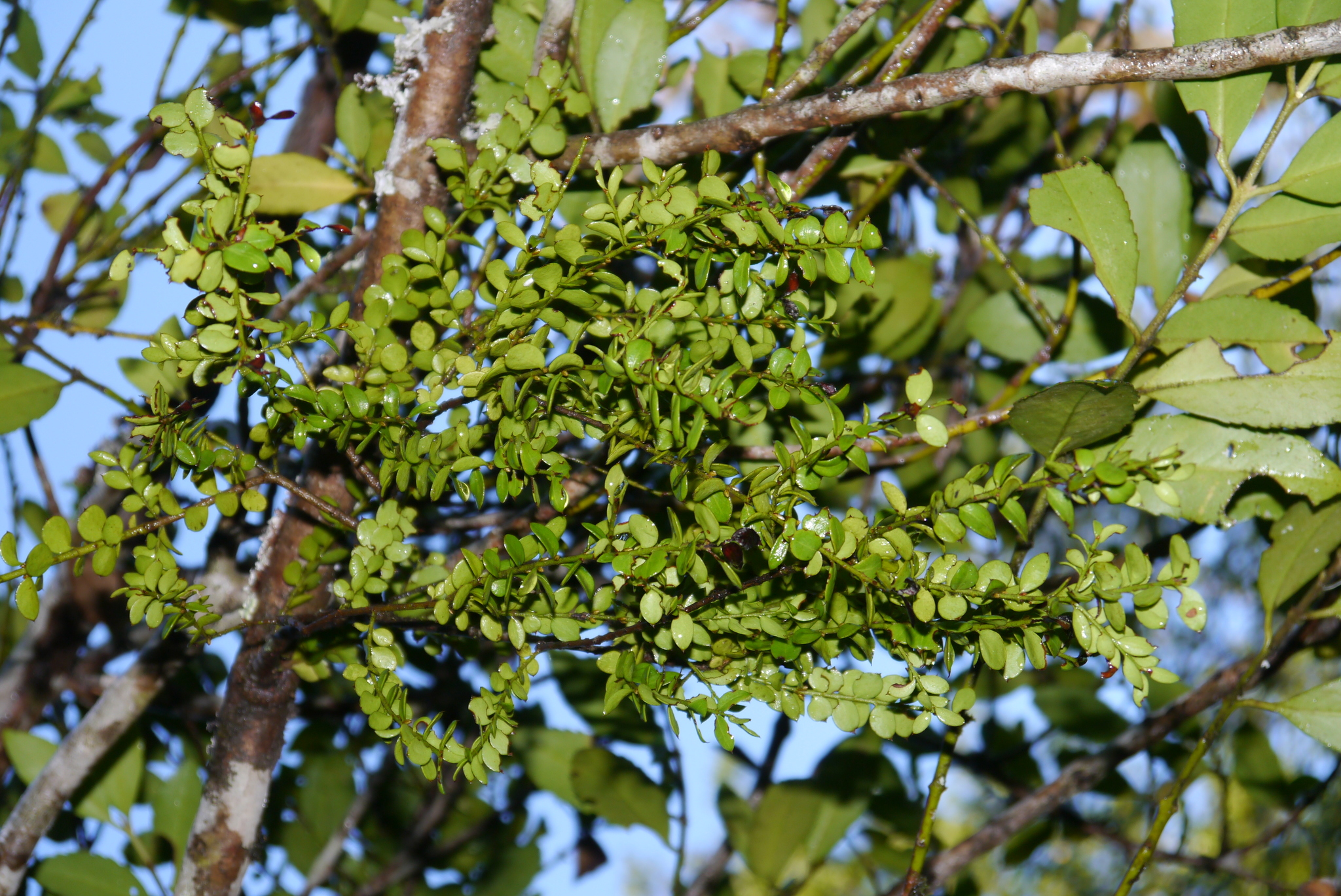
- Lepidoceras chilense

Scientific classification
- Kingdom: Plantae
- Clade: Tracheophytes
- Clade: Angiosperms
- Clade: Eudicots
- Order: Santalales
- Family: Santalaceae
- Genus: Lepidoceras; Hook.f.

= Lepidoceras =

Genus of plants

Lepidoceras is a genus of hemiparasitic flowering plants belonging to the family Santalaceae. The genus has two species; Lepidoceras chilense (Molina) Kuijt is endemic to Chile and Lepidoceras peruvianum Kuijt is endemic to Peru.

Lepidoceras chilense is known as quintral del temu in Chile. It parasitizes a variety of trees. The main hosts are Laureliopsis philippiana, Laurelia sempervirens, Temu cruckshanksii, Cryptocarya alba, Myrceugenia exsucca, Amomyrtus meli and Luma apiculata.
