= Samuel Botsford Buckley =

American botanist, geologist, and naturalist (1809–1884)

Samuel Botsford Buckley (May 9, 1809 – February 18, 1884) was an American botanist, geologist, and naturalist.

Buckley was born in Torrey, New York, on May 9, 1809. He graduated from Wesleyan University in 1836. He received a Ph.D. from Waco University in 1872.

Buckley investigated the botany of the southern United States and discovered many new species of plants and mollusks. The plant genus Buckleya was named in his honor.

Buckley determined the height of several summits in the Great Smoky Mountains, including Mount Buckley which was named in his honor.

Buckley served as an assistant to Texas chief geologist Benjamin Franklin Shumard. He named an oak species after Shumard in 1860, but then stymied Shumard's reappointment under newly-elected Governor Sam Houston.

Buckley was the Texas state geologist from 1860 to 1861 and 1874 to 1877. He was the scientific editor of the State Gazette in Austin, Texas from 1871 to 1872. He wrote numerous scientific papers as well as a book on the trees and shrubs of the United States.

Buckley died in Austin on February 18, 1884.
