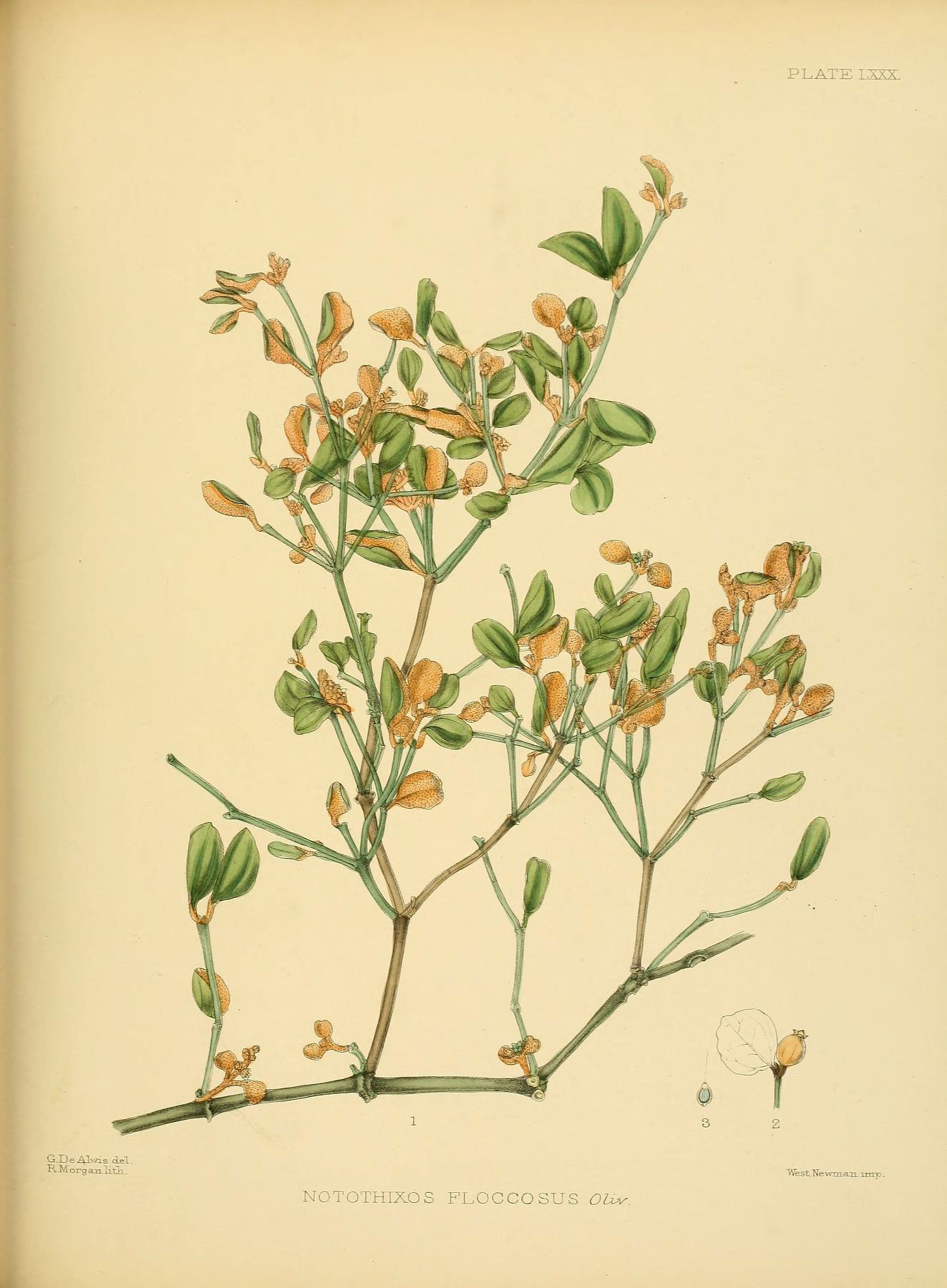
- NOTOTHIXOS FLOCCOSUS OUss.

Scientific classification
- Kingdom: Plantae
- Clade: Tracheophytes
- Clade: Angiosperms
- Clade: Eudicots
- Order: Santalales
- Family: Santalaceae
- Genus: Notothixos; Oliv. 1863

= Notothixos =

Genus of mistletoes

Notothixos is a genus of mistletoe plant in the family Santalaceae.

== Species ==
The Catalogue of Life lists:

- Notothixos cornifolius
- Notothixos floccosus
- Notothixos incanus
- Notothixos leiophyllus
- Notothixos malayanus
- Notothixos papuanus
- Notothixos subaureus
- Notothixos sulphureus
