= Ginalloa =

Scientific classification
- Kingdom: Plantae
- Clade: Tracheophytes
- Clade: Angiosperms
- Clade: Eudicots
- Order: Santalales
- Family: Santalaceae
- Genus: Ginalloa; Korth.

Species
- See text

Genus of mistletoes

Ginalloa is a genus of parasitic mistletoes found in southern and south-eastern Asia. The various species are found in the Andaman Islands and Sri Lanka, the Philippines, Malaysia, the island of Borneo, the island of Java and Papua province in Indonesia, Papua New Guinea, including the Bismarck Archipelago, Myanmar, Laos and Thailand. The genus belongs to the family Santalaceae (as this includes Viscaceae). Ginalloa arnottiana, described by Pieter Willem Korthals in 1839, is the type-species.

== Selected species ==
Ginalloa andamanica Kurz
Ginalloa applanata Danser
Ginalloa arnottiana Korth.
Ginalloa beccariana Tiegh.
Ginalloa cumingiana Benth. & Hook.f.
Ginalloa falcata Danser
Ginalloa flagellaris Barlow
Ginalloa helferi Kurz
Ginalloa lanceolata C.B.Rob.

Ginalloa laosensis Lecomte
Ginalloa linearis Danser
Ginalloa nuda Danser
Ginalloa ovata Danser
Ginalloa platyphylla Merr.
Ginalloa siamica Craib
Ginalloa spathulifolia Oliv.
Ginalloa tenuifolia Tiegh.
Ginalloa zollingerii Tiegh.

list source :
