= Dendrotrophe =

Scientific classification
- Kingdom: Plantae
- Clade: Tracheophytes
- Clade: Angiosperms
- Clade: Eudicots
- Order: Santalales
- Family: Santalaceae
- Genus: Dendrotrophe; Miq.

Synonyms
- Henslowia Blume

Genus of plants

Dendrotrophe is a genus of flowering plants belonging to the family Santalaceae. Its native range is Southern China, Indochina, Malesia, New Guinea, and Northern Queensland.

Five species are accepted.

- Dendrotrophe amorpha Stauffer
- Dendrotrophe buxifolia (Blume) Miq.
- Dendrotrophe poyneura (Hu) D.D.Tao
- Dendrotrophe umbellata (Blume) Miq.
- Dendrotrophe varians (Blume) Miq.

The genus Henslowia Blume is a synonym. Carl Ludwig Blume named Henslowia in honour of John Stevens Henslow (1796–1861). Henslow was a British priest, botanist and geologist.
