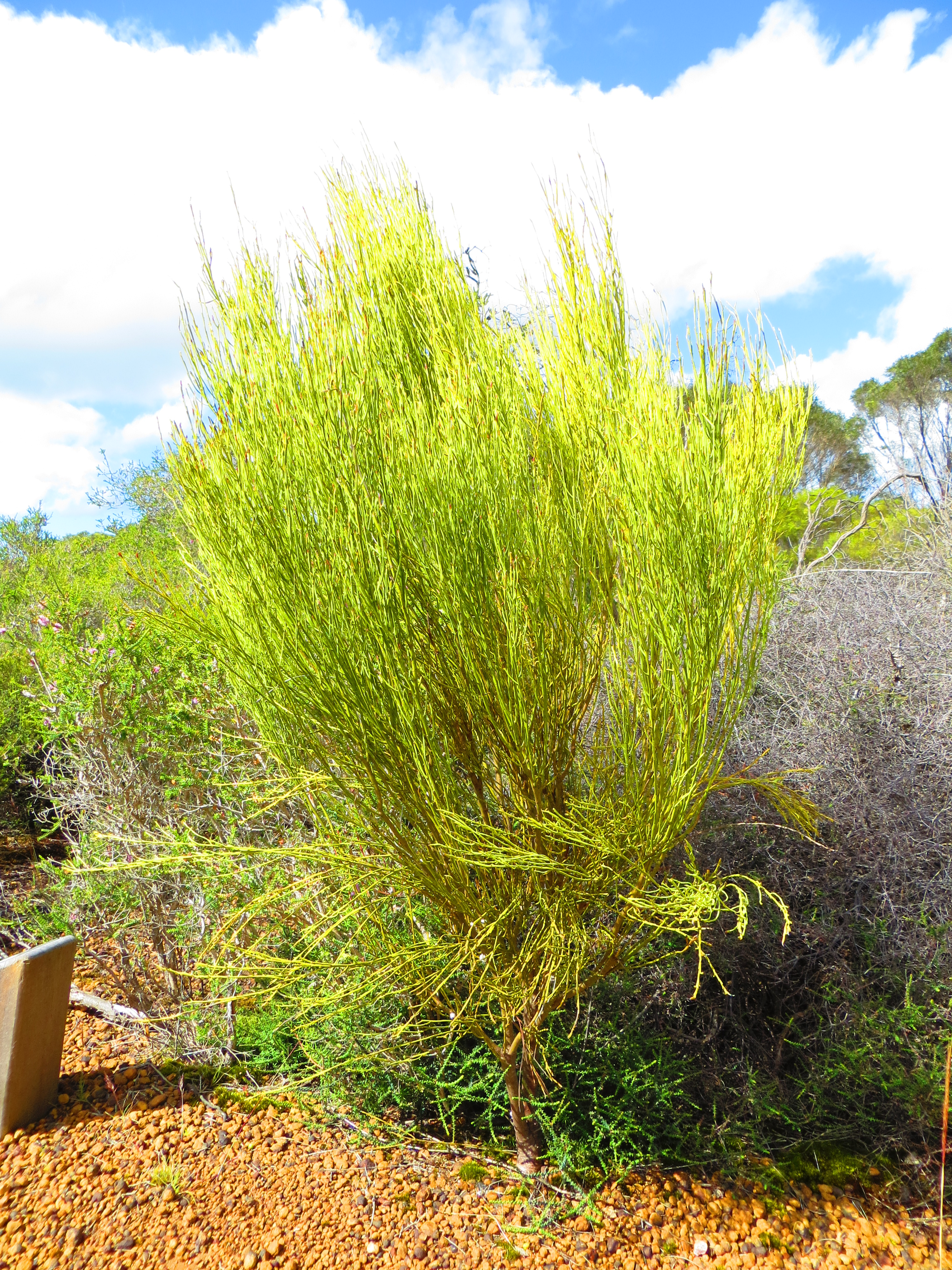
- Common sour bush (Choretrum glomeratum). Beyeria Conservation Park, Kangaroo Island, South Australia.

Scientific classification
- Kingdom: Plantae
- Clade: Tracheophytes
- Clade: Angiosperms
- Clade: Eudicots
- Order: Santalales
- Family: Santalaceae
- Genus: Choretrum; R.Br.

= Choretrum =

Genus of plant in the mistletoe family

Choretrum is a genus of shrubs and small trees in the sandalwood family, Santalaceae. The genus is endemic to Australia.

Species include:

- Choretrum candollei F.Muell. ex Benth. – White sour bush
- Choretrum chrysanthum F.Muell.
- Choretrum glomeratum R.Br. – Berry broombush, common sour bush
- Choretrum lateriflorum R.Br. – Dwarf sour bush
- Choretrum pauciflorum A.DC. – Dwarf sour bush
- Choretrum pritzelii Diels
- Choretrum spicatum F.Muell.
