= Antidaphne =

Scientific classification
- Kingdom: Plantae
- Clade: Tracheophytes
- Clade: Angiosperms
- Clade: Eudicots
- Order: Santalales
- Family: Santalaceae
- Genus: Antidaphne; Poepp. & Endl.

Genus of flowering plants

Antidaphne is a genus of flowering plants belonging to the family Santalaceae.

Its native range is Tropical America, Chile.

Species:

- Antidaphne amazonensis Rizzini
- Antidaphne andina Kuijt
- Antidaphne antidaphneoides (Rizzini) Kuijt
- Antidaphne glaziovii (Tiegh.) Kuijt
- Antidaphne hondurensis Kuijt
- Antidaphne punctulata (Clos) Kuijt
- Antidaphne schottii (Eichler) Kuijt
- Antidaphne viscoidea Poepp. & Endl.
- Antidaphne wrightii (Griseb.) Kuijt
