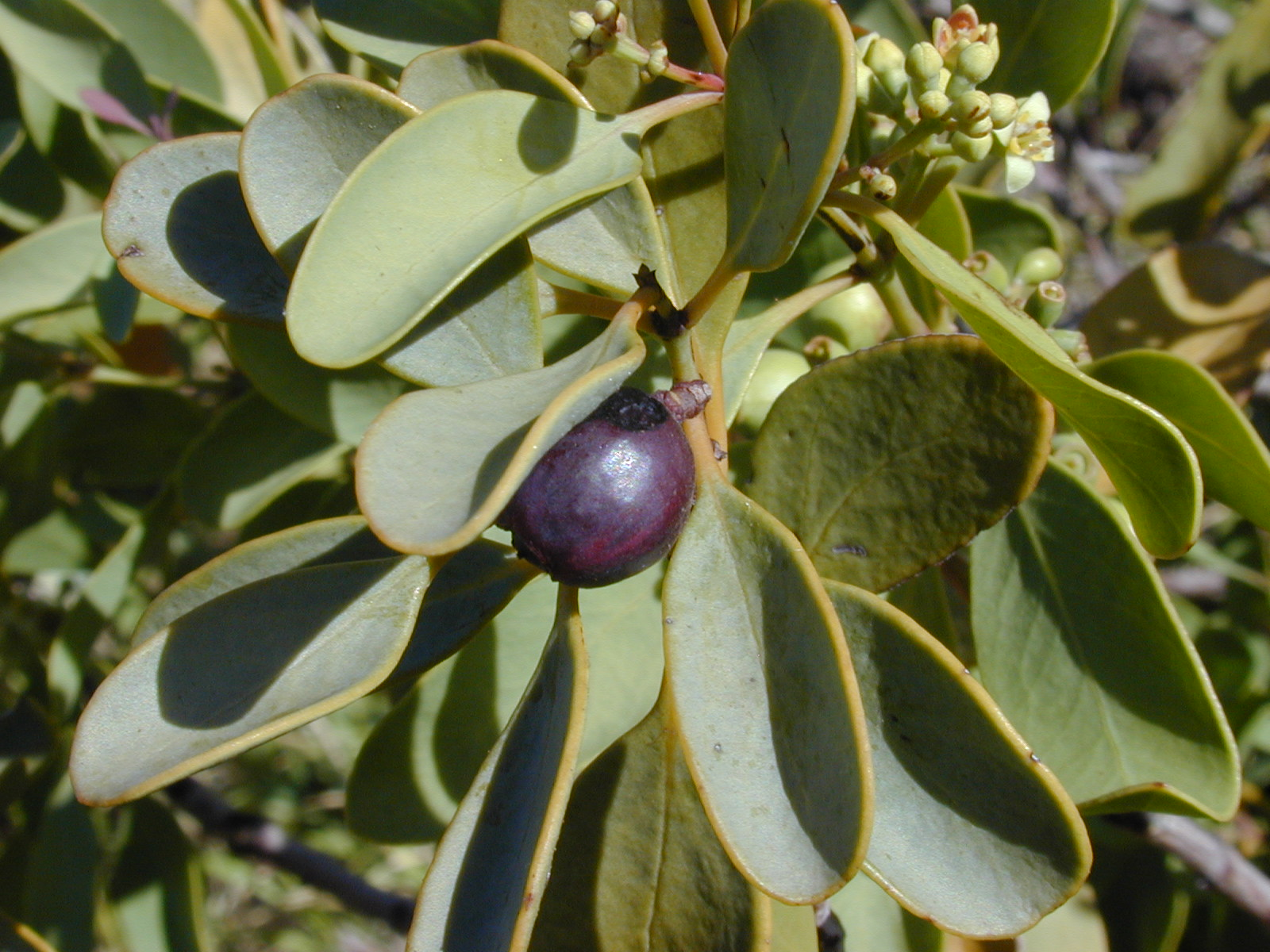
- Santalum ellipticum

Scientific classification
- Kingdom: Plantae
- Clade: Tracheophytes
- Clade: Angiosperms
- Clade: Eudicots
- Order: Santalales
- Family: Santalaceae; R.Br.

Synonyms
- Viscaceae Batsch (1802)

= Santalaceae =

Family of flowering plants

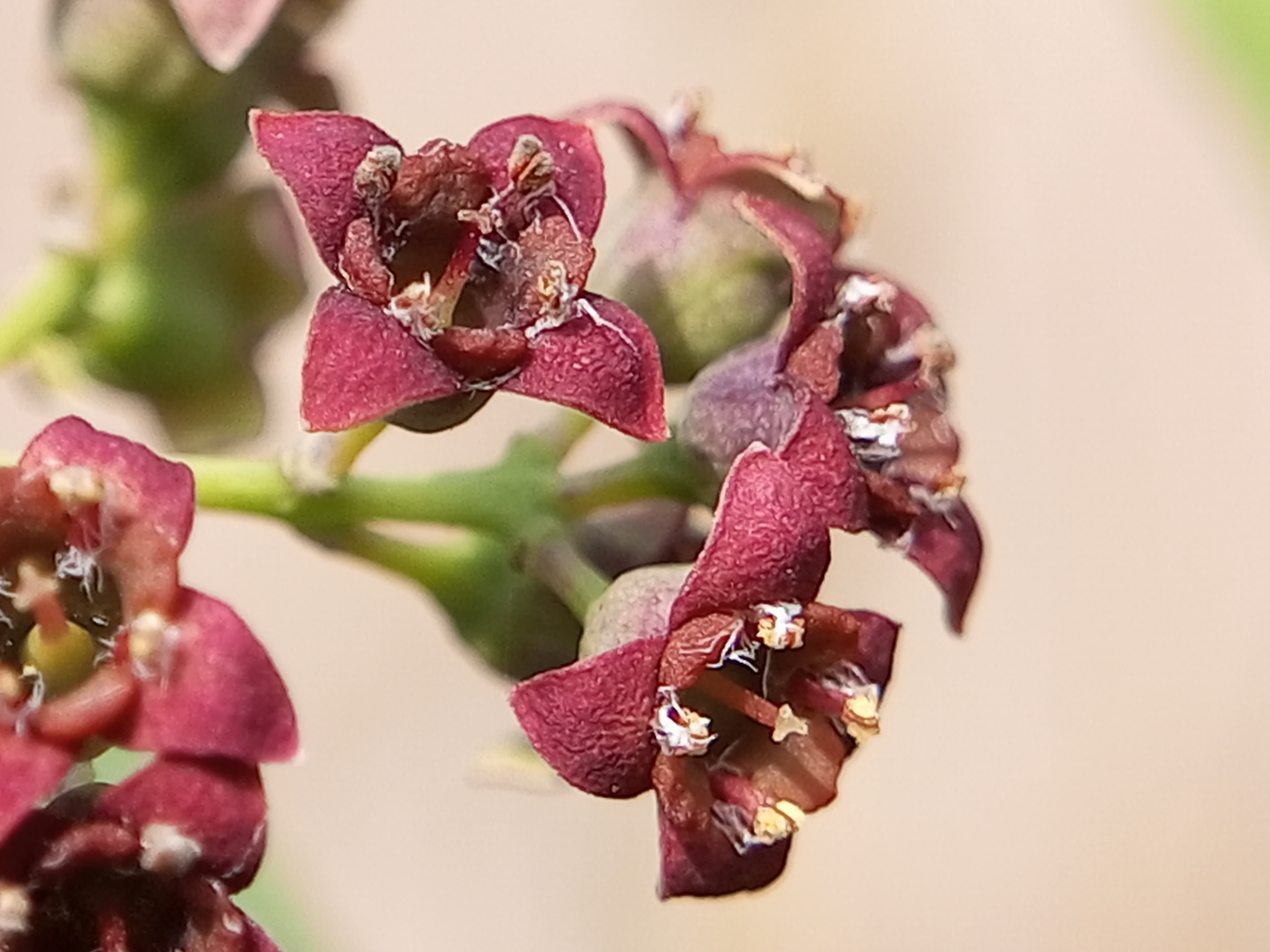
Santalum album

The Santalaceae, the sandalwood family, are a family of flowering plants (including trees, shrubs, and herbs) which, like other members of Santalales, are partially parasitic on other plants. Its flowers are often unisexual or bisexual. Modern treatments of the Santalaceae include the family Viscaceae (mistletoes), previously considered distinct. They are widely distributed worldwide, primarily across temperate and tropical regions. Many members of Santalaceae have a long history of human use. Due to overexploitation, several Santalaceae are of conservation concern.

== Description ==
=== Flowers ===
Santalaceae flowers are highly variable. They are generally small with a valvate perianth in a single whorl. The stamens are fused to the corolla, with a reduced calyx. Flowers may be unisexual by abortion ("flower drop"). The ovary varies from fully to partially inferior and occasionally superior, as in the tribe Anthoboleae.

=== Leaves ===
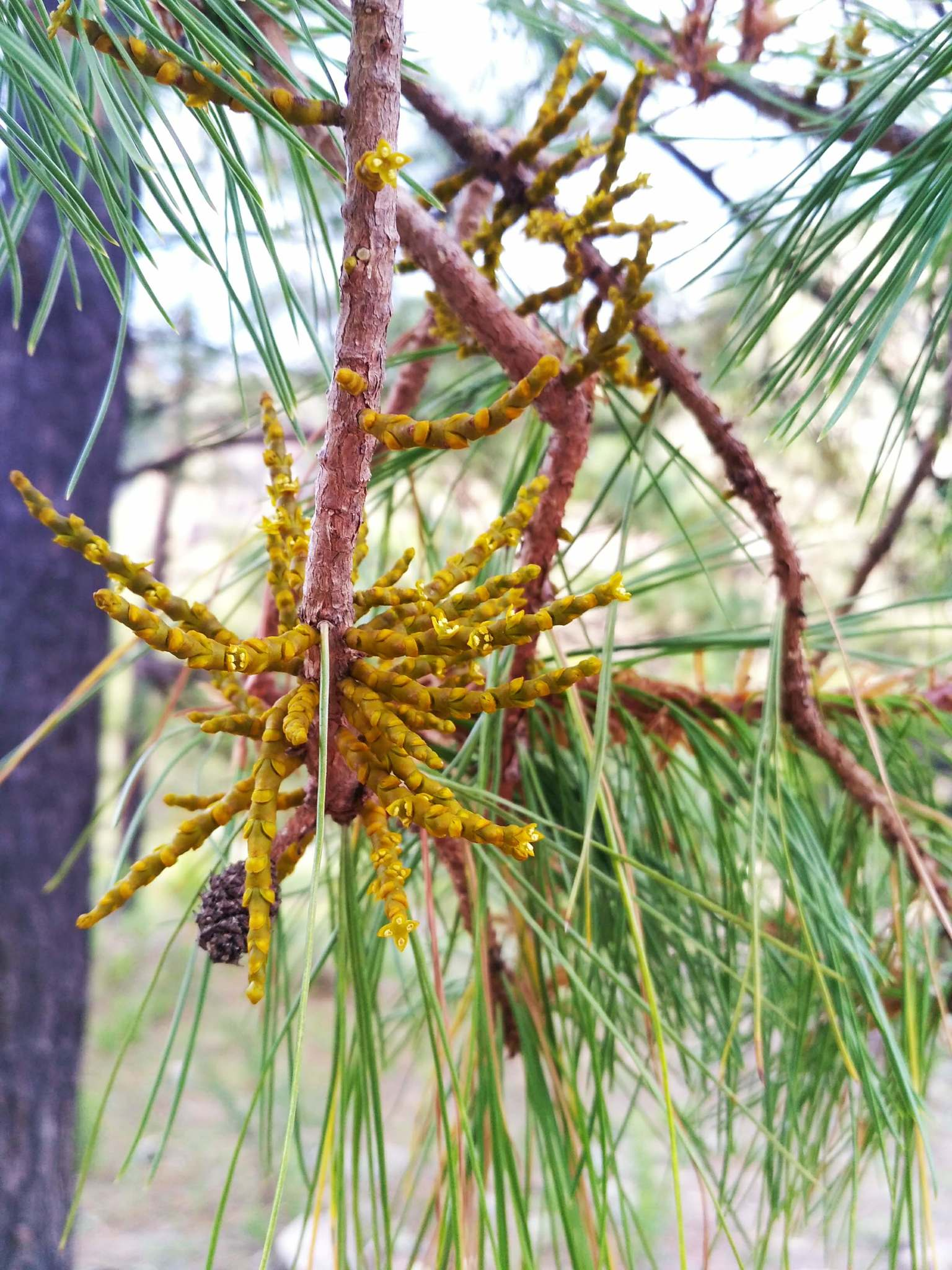
Arceuthobium strictum displaying reduced leaves

The leaves are simple and can appear as well-developed and entire or reduced to scale-like structures, depending on genus. Leaves may be deciduous or persistent depending on the biome of origin.

=== Roots and stems ===
All members of this family are holoparasitic or hemiparasistic, and have specialized organs known as haustoria that attach to the xylem and/or phloem of hosts for nutrient and water absorption. Aerial parasitism via stem haustoria has been observed in Amphorogyneae, Eremolepidaceae, and Viscaceae. Most (but not all) of Santalaceae are generalist parasites, and may parasitize multiple hosts at once.

=== Seeds ===
The presence of acetylenic santalbic acid is a feature unique to the seed oils of multiple Santalales families, including Santalaceae (with the potential exception of Visaceae). Multiple types of rare fatty acids have also been observed across various other plant structures. These compounds are of interest for medical, phylogenetic, and chemical research.

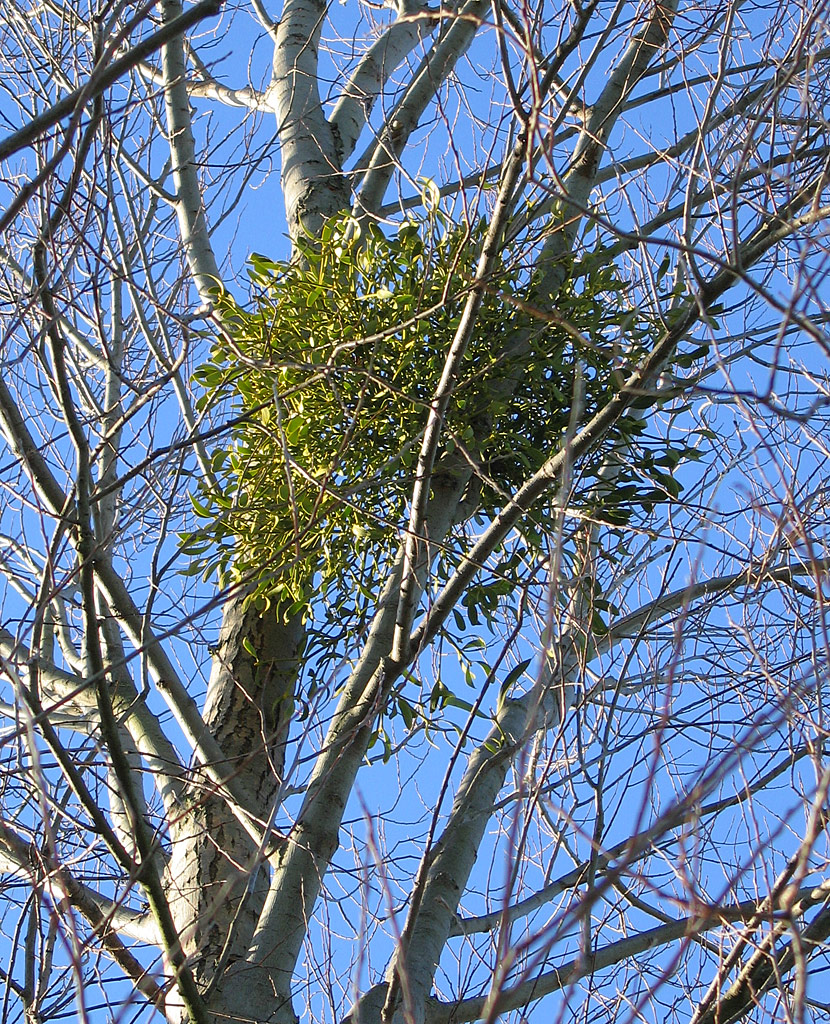
Aerial parasitism of poplar

== Taxonomy ==
The taxonomy of Santalaceae has undergone extensive and ongoing revisions. Species within Santalaceae display a wide variety of trait characters, and the family lacks broad synapomorphies. The families Amphorogynaceae, Cervantesiaceae, Comandraceae, and Nanodeaceae were previously considered distinct, but have since been reincorporated under Santalaceae. Molecular analysis has confirmed Santalaceae as monophyletic and suggests the presence of eight clades.

The APG II system of 2003 recognizes the family and assigns it to the order Santalales in the clade core eudicots. However, the circumscription by APG is much wider than accepted by previous classifications, including the plants earlier treated in families Eremolepidaceae and Viscaceae. It includes over 1,000 species across 43 genera.

== Ecology ==
Members of Santalaceae can be found broadly distributed across the globe, with genera specializing in either dry or tropical regions. The family includes small trees, shrubs, perennial herbs, and epiphytic climbers. Mycorrhizal association has been found to vary across Santalaceae.

== Uses ==
Multiple genera of Santalaceae have documented medical and cultural uses that date back as far as 2000 BCE. Sandalwood oil and wood is sourced from a variety of tree species within the family, which are considered sacred in Buddhist, Hindu, and Muslim traditions. The tree Santalum album L. is the most economically and culturally important sandalwood, and its byproducts are utilized for cosmetic, pharmaceutical, and religious purposes. Research India is currently the largest producer of sandalwood oil, which is extracted from the heartwood of the tree.

The Thesium genus contains 23 different species that have reported medical or functional uses, with 18 species utilized to treat 137 different health conditions. These include reproductive, respiratory, digestive, urinary, and oral disorders, among others. Recorded medicinal uses of Thesium are confined to African and Asian species. Various species of mistletoes, including those within Santalaceae, have specific and extensive cultural importance separate from other members of the family.

Various species of Santalaceae are edible and have a history of human consumption by Indigenous peoples of Australia, South America, and North America.

== Conservation ==
There are 11 species of Santalaceae are listed as critically endangered under the IUCN list, with an additional 24 species endangered and 18 as vulnerable. Sandalwood tree species have been particularly impacted by overharvesting for commercial use, disease, and other anthropogenic activities. This has led to more intensive regulation of international sandalwood trade, as well as efforts to map existing wild stands. Despite these efforts, illegal logging remains extensive. Human impacts and climate change also pose risk to specialist species within the Thesium genus.

== Genera ==
40 genera are accepted.

- Acanthosyris (Eichler) Griseb.
- Amphorogyne Stauffer & Hürl.
- Antidaphne Poepp. & Endl. (previously Eremolepidaceae)
- Arceuthobium M.Bieb. (previously Viscaceae)
- Buckleya Torr.
- Cervantesia Ruiz & Pav.
- Choretrum R.Br.
- Comandra Nutt.
- Daenikera Hürl. & Stauffer
- Dendromyza Danser
- Dendrophthora Eichler (previously Viscaceae)
- Dendrotrophe Miq.
- Dufrenoya Chatin
- Eubrachion Hook.f. (previously Eremolepidaceae)
- Exocarpos Labill. (synonym Omphacomeria A.DC.)
- Geocaulon Fernald
- Ginalloa Korth. (previously Viscaceae)
- Jodina Hook. & Arn. ex Meisn.
- Korthalsella Tiegh.
- Lacomucinaea Nickrent & M.A.García
- Lepidoceras Hook.f. (previously Eremolepidaceae)
- Leptomeria R.Br.
- Mida R.Cunn. ex A.Cunn.
- Myoschilos Ruiz & Pav.
- Nanodea Banks ex C.F.Gaertn.
- Nestronia Raf.
- Notothixos Oliv. (previously Viscaceae)
- Okoubaka Pellegr. & Normand
- Osyridicarpos A.DC.
- Osyris L.
- Phacellaria Benth.
- Phoradendron Nutt. (previously Viscaceae)
- Pilgerina Z.S.Rogers, Nickrent & Malécot
- Pyrularia Michx.
- Rhoiacarpos A.DC.
- Santalum L.
- Scleropyrum Arn.
- Staufferia Z.S.Rogers, Nickrent & Malécot
- Thesium L.
- Viscum L. (previously Viscaceae)

=== Formerly placed here ===
- Anthobolus R.Br. – to Opiliaceae
- Arjona - to Schoepfiaceae
- Quinchamalium - to Schoepfiaceae
