= Oak mistletoe =

Oak mistletoe is a common name for several plants and may refer to:

- Phoradendron coryae, native to western North America
- Phoradendron leucarpum, native to central North America
- Phoradendron villosum, native to far western North America
