= Hairy mistletoe =

Hairy mistletoe is a common name for several plants and may refer to:

- Erianthemum dregei, native to Africa
- Phoradendron capitellatum, native to Arizona, New Mexico, Chihuahua and Sonora
- Phoradendron leucarpum, native to much of North America
- Phoradendron tomentosum, native to Texas, Oklahoma, Louisiana and Mississippi
