= Phoradendron libocedri =

Scientific classification
- Kingdom: Plantae
- Clade: Tracheophytes
- Clade: Angiosperms
- Clade: Eudicots
- Order: Santalales
- Family: Santalaceae
- Genus: Phoradendron
- Species: P. libocedri

Binomial name
- Phoradendron libocedri (Engelm.) Howell

Species of flowering plant

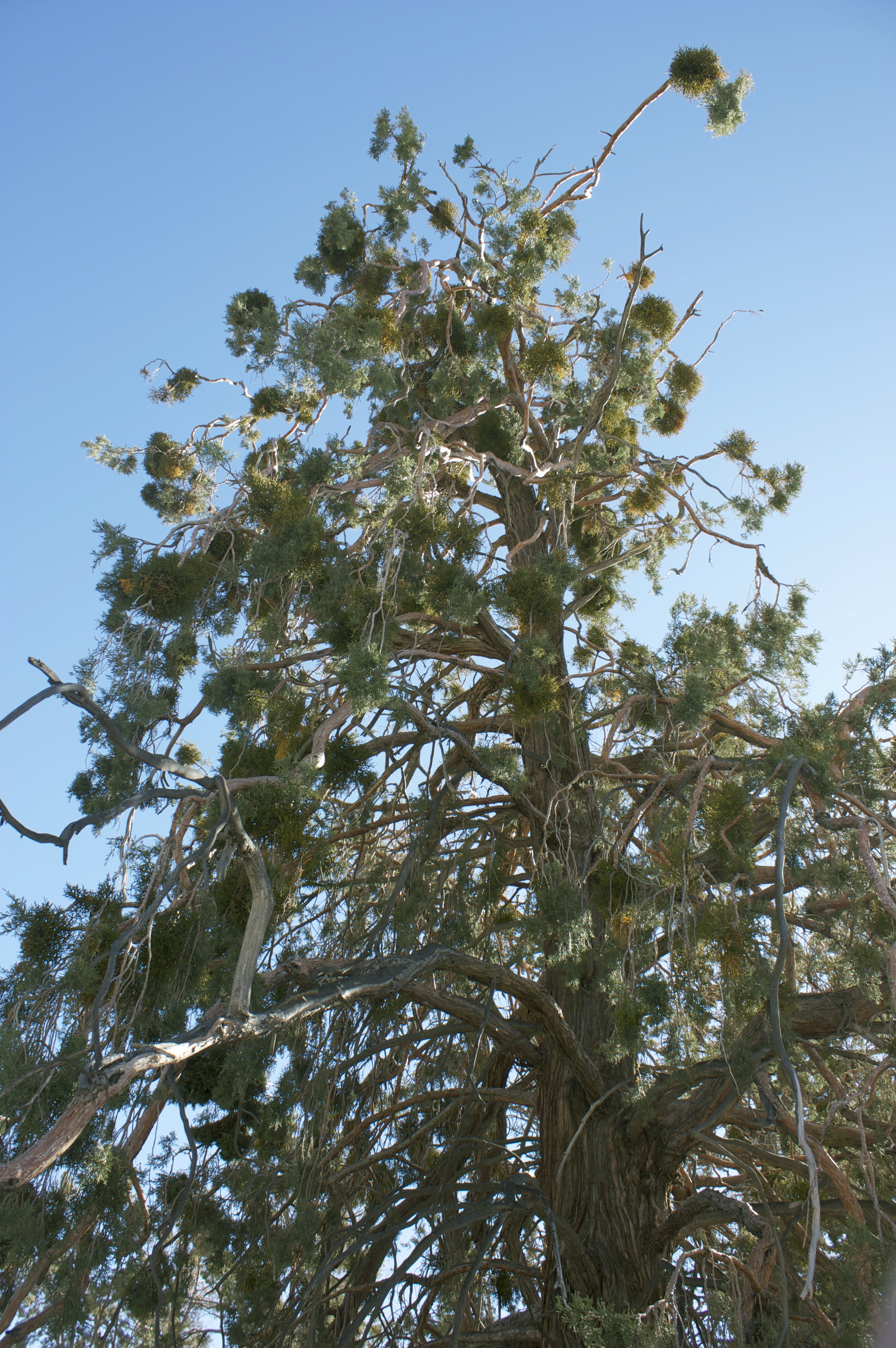
A calocedrus decurrens infected with Phoradendron libocedri.

Phoradendron libocedri is a species of flowering plant in the sandalwood family known by the common name incense-cedar mistletoe. It is native to western North America from Oregon to Baja California, where it grows in forests on its host tree, the California incense-cedar (Calocedrus decurrens).

This mistletoe is a shrub producing greenish erect, hanging, or drooping branches from a woody base where it grows attached to the tree, parasitizing it for water and nutrients. As a hemiparasite it contains some chlorophyll and can photosynthesize some energy for itself as well. The smooth, noded branches have flattened, scale-like leaves.

The plant is dioecious, with male and female individuals producing different forms of inflorescence with knobby flower clusters. Female flowers yield light pink or yellowish spherical berries each 3 or 4 millimeters wide.
