= Phoradendron pomasquianum =

Conservation status
- Vulnerable (IUCN 3.1)

Scientific classification
- Kingdom: Plantae
- Clade: Tracheophytes
- Clade: Angiosperms
- Clade: Eudicots
- Order: Santalales
- Family: Santalaceae
- Genus: Phoradendron
- Species: P. pomasquianum

Binomial name
- Phoradendron pomasquianum Trel.

Species of flowering plant

Phoradendron pomasquianum is a species of plant in the Santalaceae family. It is endemic to Ecuador. Its natural habitat is subtropical or tropical moist montane forests.
