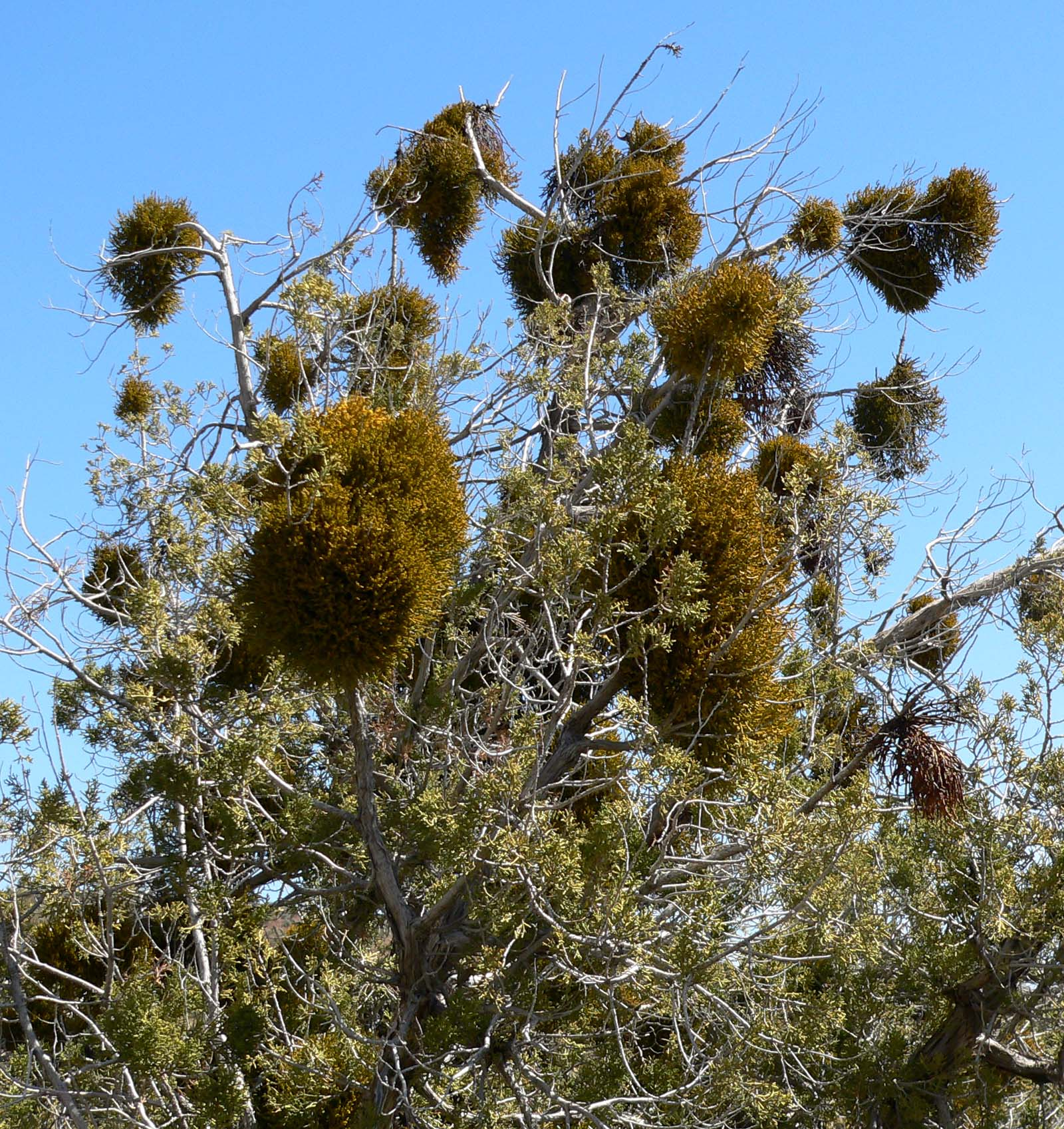
- juniper mistletoe in host tree

Conservation status
- Secure (NatureServe)

Scientific classification
- Kingdom: Plantae
- Clade: Embryophytes
- Clade: Tracheophytes
- Clade: Angiosperms
- Clade: Eudicots
- Order: Santalales
- Family: Santalaceae
- Genus: Phoradendron
- Species: P. juniperinum

Binomial name
- Phoradendron juniperinum Engelm. ex A.Gray

Synonyms
- Phoradendron ligatum Trel.

= Phoradendron juniperinum =

Species of dwarf mistletoe

Phoradendron juniperinum is a species of flowering plant in the sandalwood family known by the common name juniper mistletoe. It is native to the southwestern United States and northern Mexico, where it grows in various types of woodland habitat. It has been reported from California, Nevada, Arizona, New Mexico, Oregon, Utah, Texas, Chihuahua and Sonora.

This mistletoe parasitizes species of juniper, including Utah (Juniperus osteosperma), Rocky Mountain (J. scopulorum), and western juniper (J. occidentalis).

It is a shrub producing many erect and spreading yellow-green branches 20 to 40 centimeters long from a woody base where it attaches to its host tree, tapping the xylem for water and nutrients. It is hemiparasitic, meaning it contains some chlorophyll and can photosynthesize some energy for itself as well. The smooth, noded branches have flattened, scale-like leaves. The plant is dioecious, with male and female individuals producing different forms of inflorescence with knobby flower clusters.

Female flowers yield shiny light pink spherical berries each about 4 millimeters wide.

Birds eat the fruits and excrete the undigested seeds on tree branches, where they root.

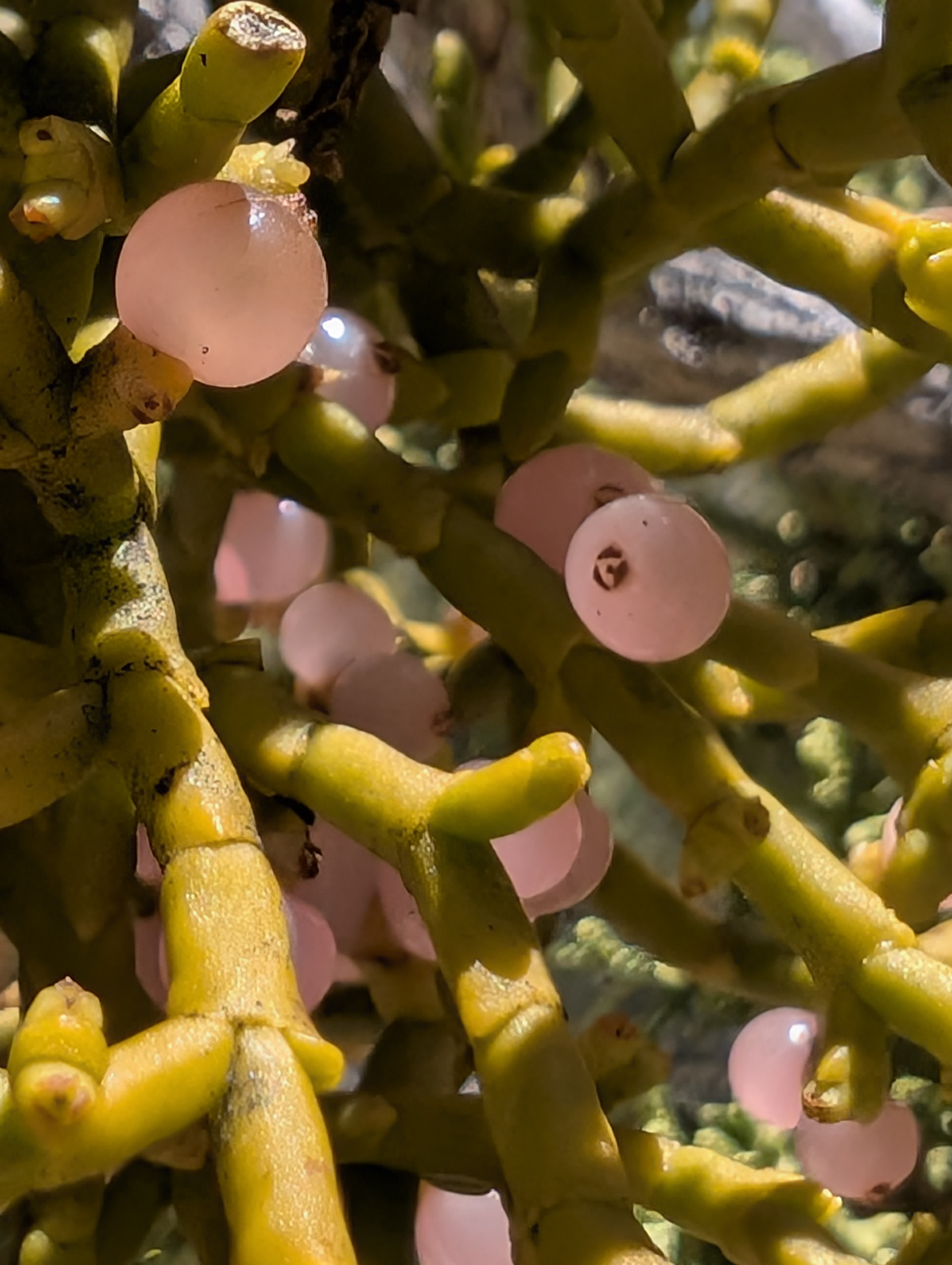
Juniper Mistletoe Berry

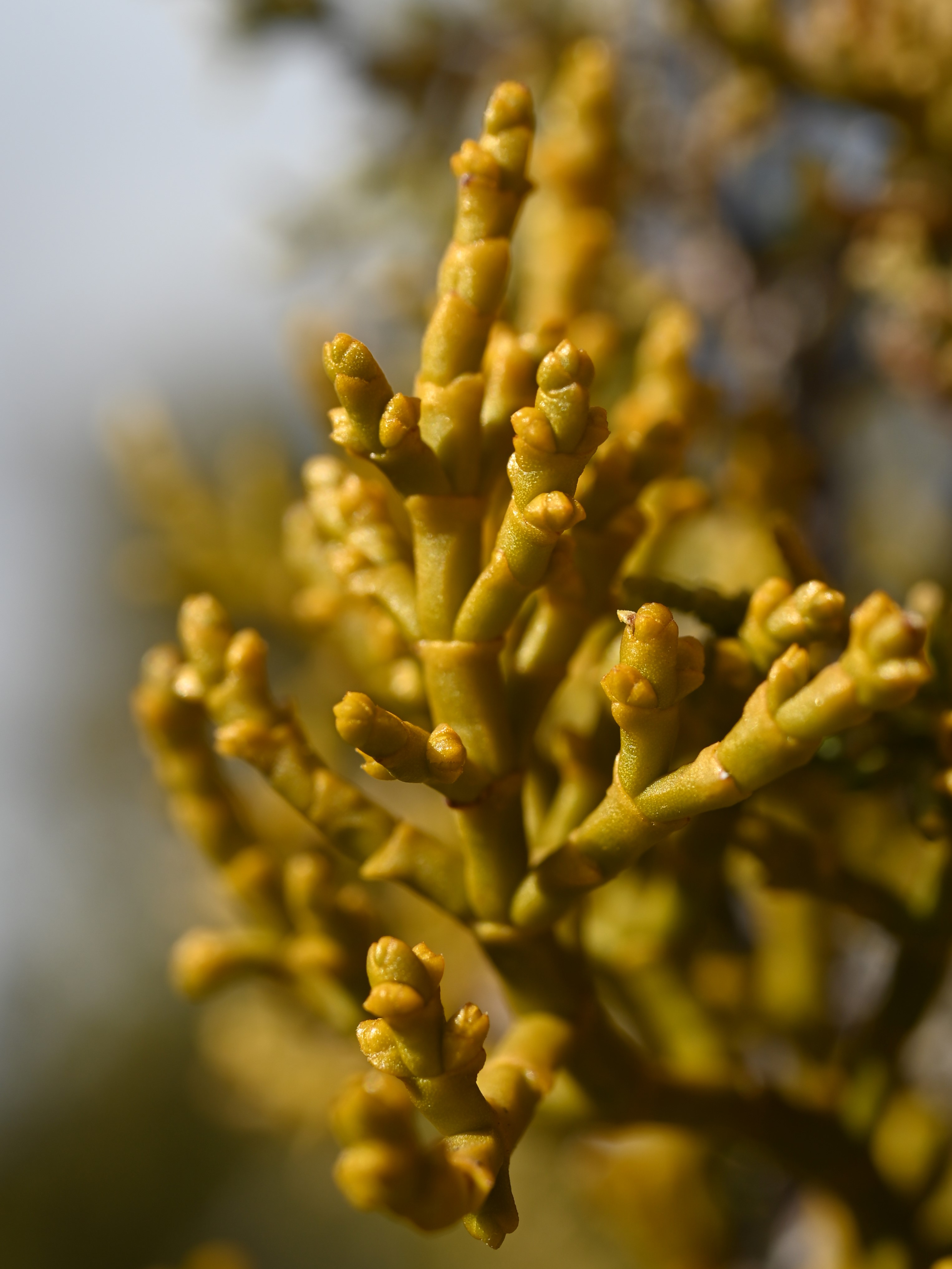
Phoradendron juniperinum

== Taxonomy ==
The botanist Asa Gray scientifically described Phoradendron juniperinum in 1849, crediting George Engelmann. The species is classified in the Phoradendron genus within the wider Santalaceae family. The species has three heterotypic synonyms.

Table of Synonyms
Name	Year	Rank
Phoradendron juniperinum var. ligatum (Trel.) Fosberg	1941	variety
Phoradendron juniperinum f. nanum Trel.	1916	form
Phoradendron ligatum Trel.	1916	species

== Uses ==
Several Native American tribes used this mistletoe for medicinal purposes, for teas, and at times for food. Among the Zuni people, an infusion of whole plant is used for stomachaches. A compound infusion of plant taken to promote muscular relaxation at birth, and a simple or compound infusion of twigs taken after childbirth to stop blood flow.
