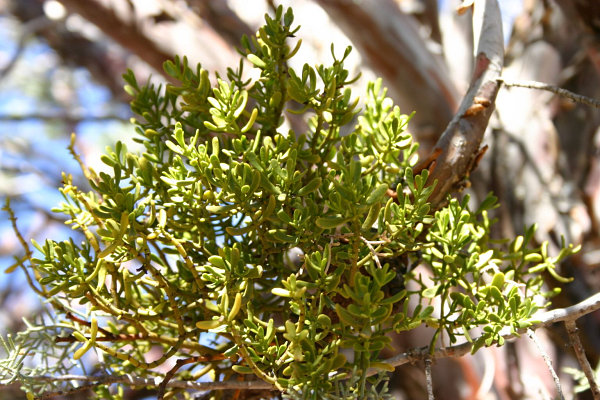

Scientific classification
- Kingdom: Plantae
- Clade: Tracheophytes
- Clade: Angiosperms
- Clade: Eudicots
- Order: Santalales
- Family: Santalaceae
- Genus: Phoradendron
- Species: P. densum

Binomial name
- Phoradendron densum Torr. ex Trel.

= Phoradendron densum =

Species of tree

Phoradendron densum Trel. is a species of flowering plant in the sandalwood family known by the common name dense mistletoe. It is native to the western United States and northwestern Mexico, where it grows in various types of woodland habitat. It has been reported from California, Oregon, Arizona and Baja California. This mistletoe parasitizes species of cypress, including Arizona cypress (Cupressus arizonica), and juniper (Juniperus spp.).

It can be found tangled in the branches of its host tree, extending its own erect branches 30 to 50 centimeters. It has green leaves around a centimeter long and half a centimeter wide. It is dioecious, with male and female plants producing different forms of inflorescence with round, knoblike flowers. The female flowers yield spherical berries each about 4 millimeters wide and yellowish or pale pink when ripe.
