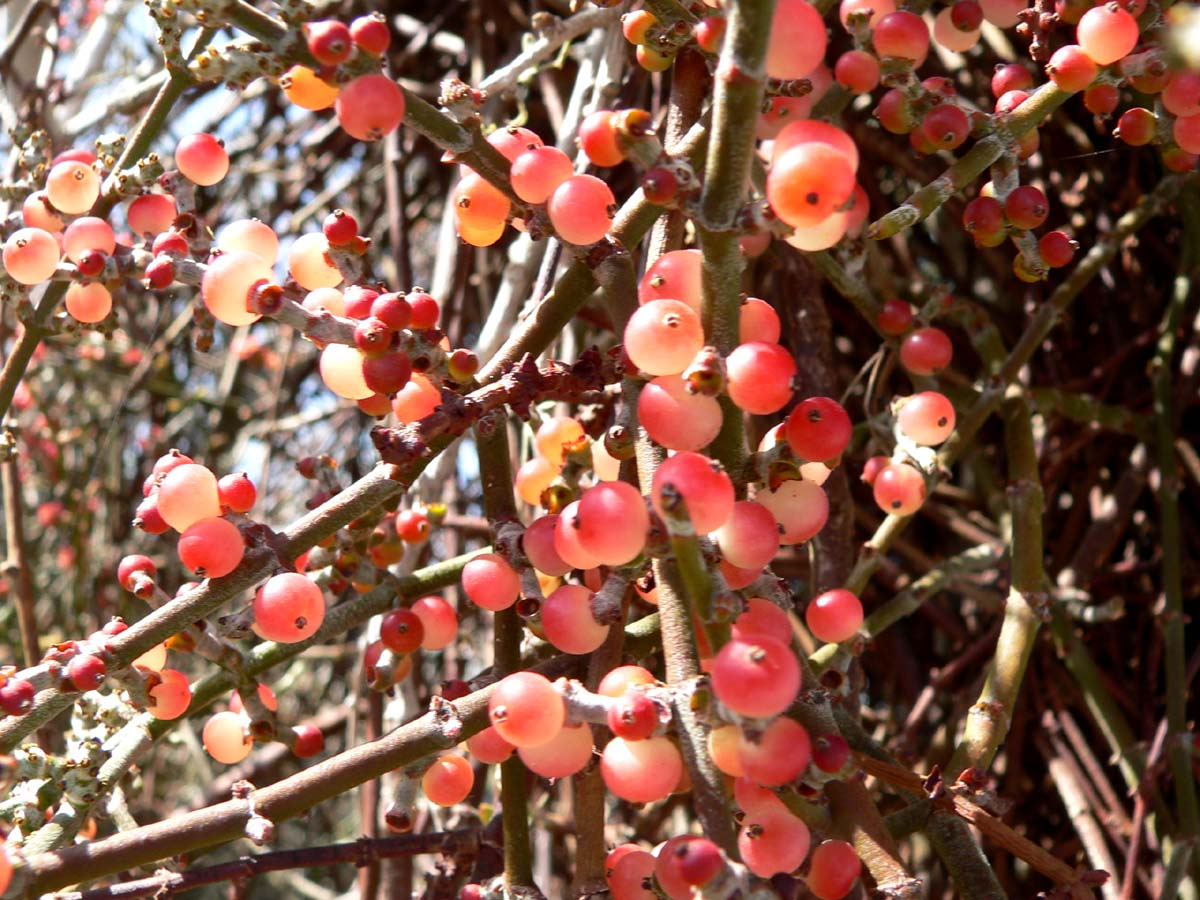

Scientific classification
- Kingdom: Plantae
- Clade: Tracheophytes
- Clade: Angiosperms
- Clade: Eudicots
- Order: Santalales
- Family: Santalaceae
- Genus: Phoradendron
- Species: P. californicum

Binomial name
- Phoradendron californicum Nutt.

= Phoradendron californicum =

Species of flowering plant

Phoradendron californicum, the desert mistletoe or mesquite mistletoe, is a hemiparasitic plant native to southern California, Nevada, Arizona, Sonora, Sinaloa and Baja California. It can be found in the Mojave and Sonoran Deserts at altitudes of up to 1,400 m (4,593 ft).

The mistletoe is a leafless plant that attaches to host plants, often leguminous woody desert trees such as Cercidium and Prosopis. Desert mistletoe takes water and minerals from its host plants but it does its own photosynthesis, making it a hemiparasite. Desert mistletoes, like mistletoes in general, weave nutrient cycles together through their unique life history.

== Human use ==
Common names include visco, tojí, tzavo, secapalo, injerto, and chili de espino in Spanish; aaxt in Seri.

The white to reddish fruit is edible, but native tribes only ate the fruit of mistletoes growing on mesquite (Prosopis), ironwood (Olneya tesota) or catclaw acacia (Acacia greggii). When found growing on palo verde (Parkinsonia) or Condalia (desert buckthorn), the fruit is considered inedible. The Seri people consider desert mistletoe fruit ripe and harvestable once it turns translucent. Harvest is done by spreading a blanket below the plant and hitting it with sticks to release the fruit. Seri consumed the fruit raw. The Tohono O'odham also consumed the fruit raw. River Pima ate the fruit boiled and mashed, which made it the consistency of a pudding. The Cahuilla gathered the fruit from November to April, and boiled them into a paste with a sprinkle of wood ash added to the pot.

Desert mistletoe plants, but not the berries, contain phoratoxins which can easily lead to death via slowed heart rate, increased blood pressure, convulsions, or cardiac arrest. Some of these compounds can cause hallucinations, but there is no way to judge dosage. People seeking a "high" from mistletoe still turn up in morgues each year. Native peoples used plants other than desert mistletoe to seek visions.

Amateur entrepreneurs in Tucson, Phoenix and other cities in the Sonoran Desert frequently sell cuttings of desert mistletoe on street corners during the Christmas season. This is despite the fact that the species looks very different from other mistletoes traditionally used as holiday decorations elsewhere.

== Pollination ==
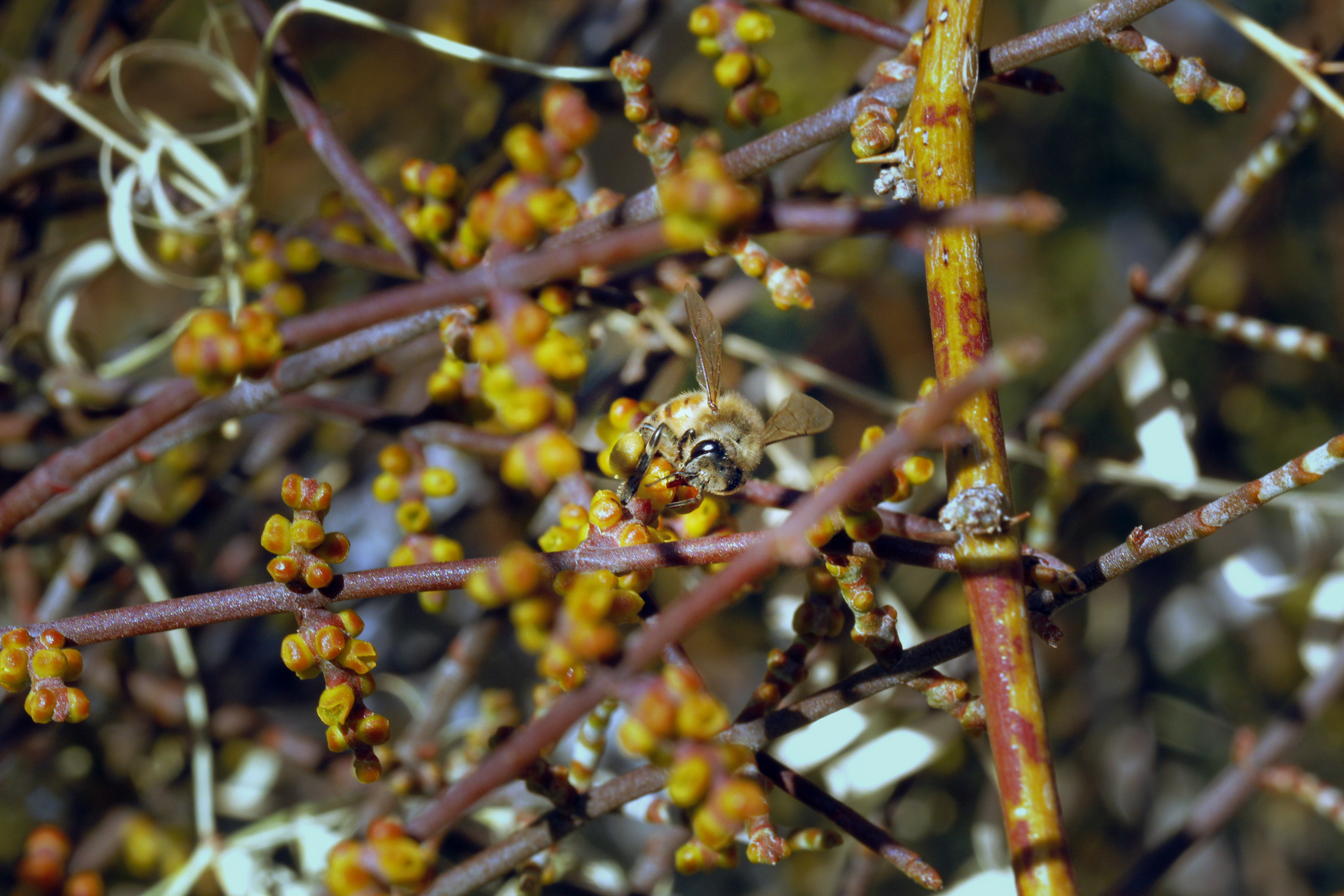
Honeybee visiting flowers

Desert mistletoes are dioecious and rely on insects for pollination. They produce inconspicuous, fragrant flowers during the winter. A February 2015 inventory observed 13 species of Diptera and 3 species of Hymenoptera observed on the female flowers of P. californicum in the catclaw acacias (Acacia greggii) of the Eldorado Mountains in the southern Mojave desert. The most abundant pollinator was the fruit fly Euarestoides acutangulus, followed by the blowfly Phormia regina then the hover fly Eupeodes volucris.

== Dispersal ==
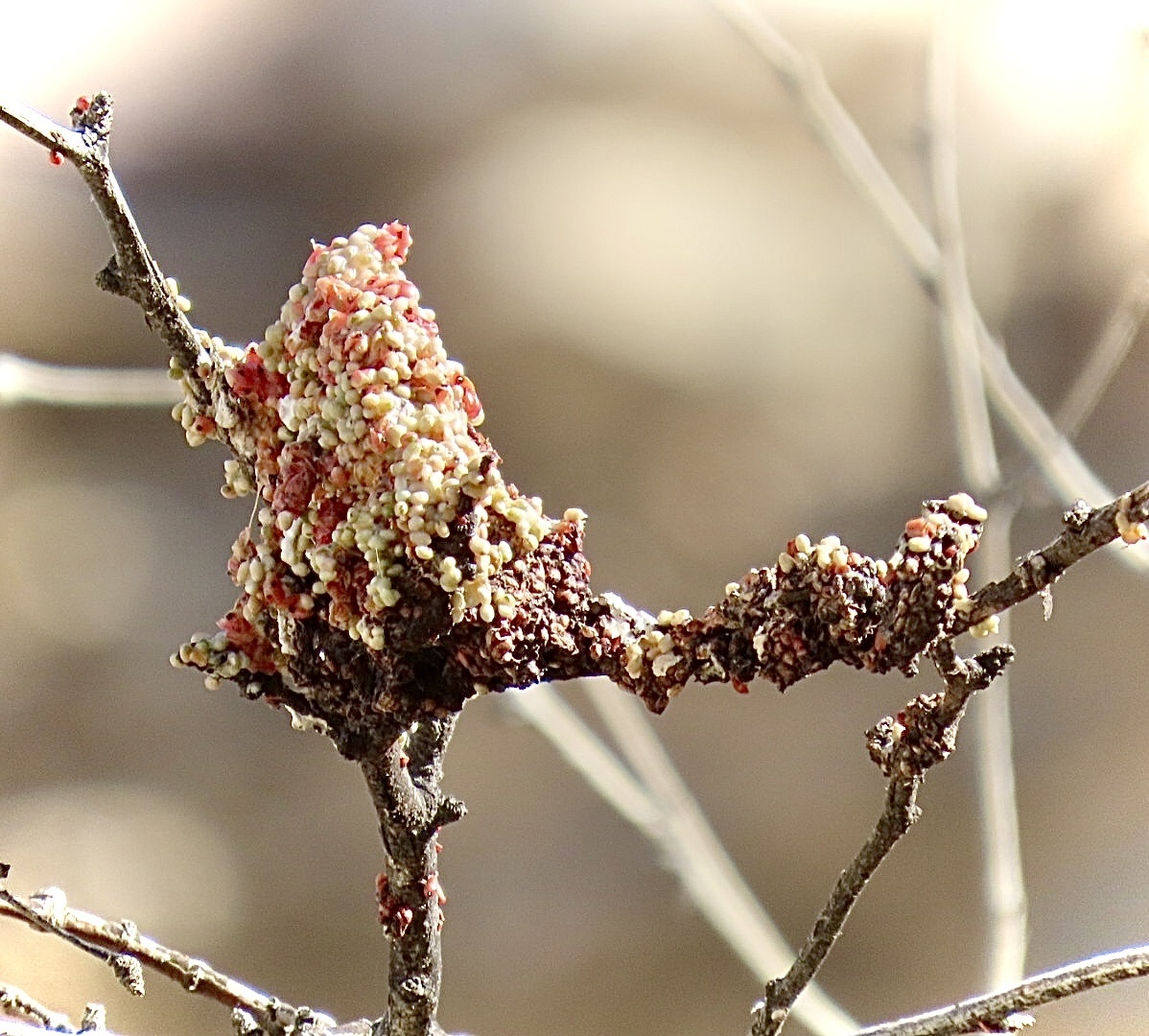
Phainopepla feces.

Female desert mistletoe plants produce red to clear berries that are primarily eaten by the phainopepla (Phainopepla nitens), a silky flycatcher, which then spreads the seeds. Phainopeplas do not digest the seed inside the berries, and the birds disperse the seeds when they defecate or wipe their bills. The phainopepla is a specialist dispersal agent of desert mistletoe. A dispersal survey observed phainapepla was the most common bird eating mistletoe berries, followed by Northern mockingbird and Gila woodpecker. The study noted that Phainopepla is the most effective dispersal agent, because they spend the majority of their time in host plants, while the mockingbird and woodpecker are generalists that do not spend as much time in the host plants.

== Host specialization ==
There is evidence to suggest that P. californicum is undergoing "host race evolution", which is a pattern of evolution which, in parasitic plants, results from specialization of different populations of the same parasite species to different hosts in an environment. Host race evolution can possibly lead to speciation over time. There are genetic, morphological, and phenological differences in P. californicum individuals depending on the particular host on which they are found.

Isoenzymes are enzymes that perform the same phenotypic function, but vary genetically between individuals of the same species. Electrophoresis analysis has shown that isoenzymes differ significantly between P. californicum found on catclaw acacia (A. greggii) and honey mesquite (N. glandulosa), which are two common hosts that geographically co-concur. Another study utilized microsatellite comparisons for mistletoe populations growing on catclaw acacia and velvet mesquite (P. velutina), finding significant variation between populations depending on host, and very few instances of heterozygosity in individual mistletoes. This research suggests that mistletoe species growing on different hosts are experiencing some amount of genetic isolation, which may be contributing to their differentiation.

Morphologically, there are some recorded differences in physical characteristics between P. californicum individuals collected on various hosts. Internode length, berry color, and main/lateral shoot diameter ratio were shown to vary on average between mistletoes collected from catclaw acacia compared to honey mesquite. Phenologically, the timing of mistletoe growth checkpoints appears to depend somewhat on the host it is growing on. Mistletoe growing on catclaw acacia were shown to flower about one month before mistletoe growing on velvet mesquite, even within a similar geographic area. Additionally, various species of pollinators showed consistency in the hosts of the mistletoe they visited, suggesting a level of pre-zygotic isolation between host-specialized mistletoe populations.

Overall, the specific driver of host specialization in P. californicum is still unknown, but there is evidence to support dispersal bird behavior, pollinator preferences, and host defenses/signals as possible factors based on research on both P. californicum and other mistletoe species. Interestingly, there is also evidence against climate change and geographic isolation as drivers of host race evolution in both P. californicum and other mistletoe species.

== Gallery ==
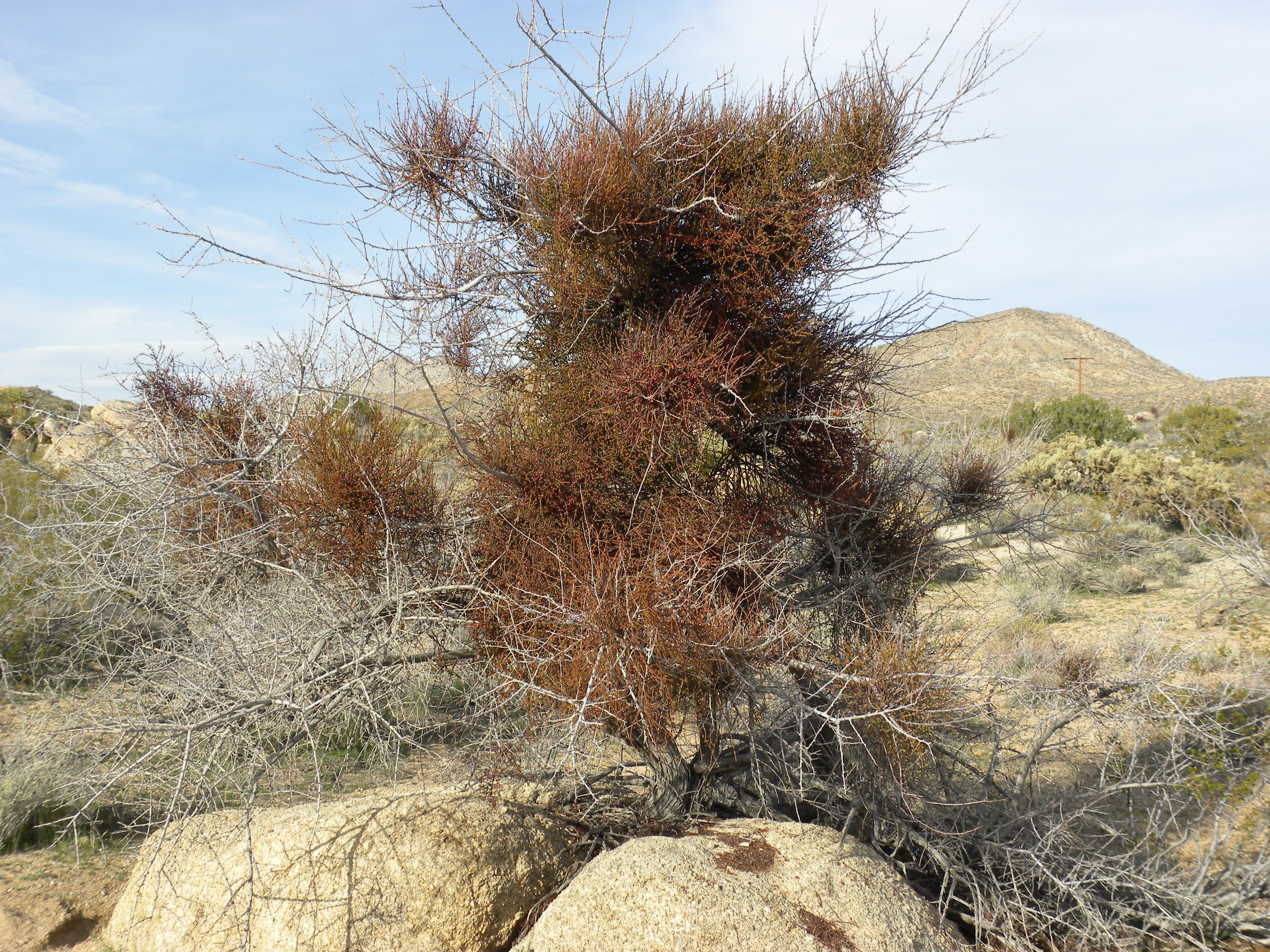
Desert mistletoe in the Mojave Desert of southern California.

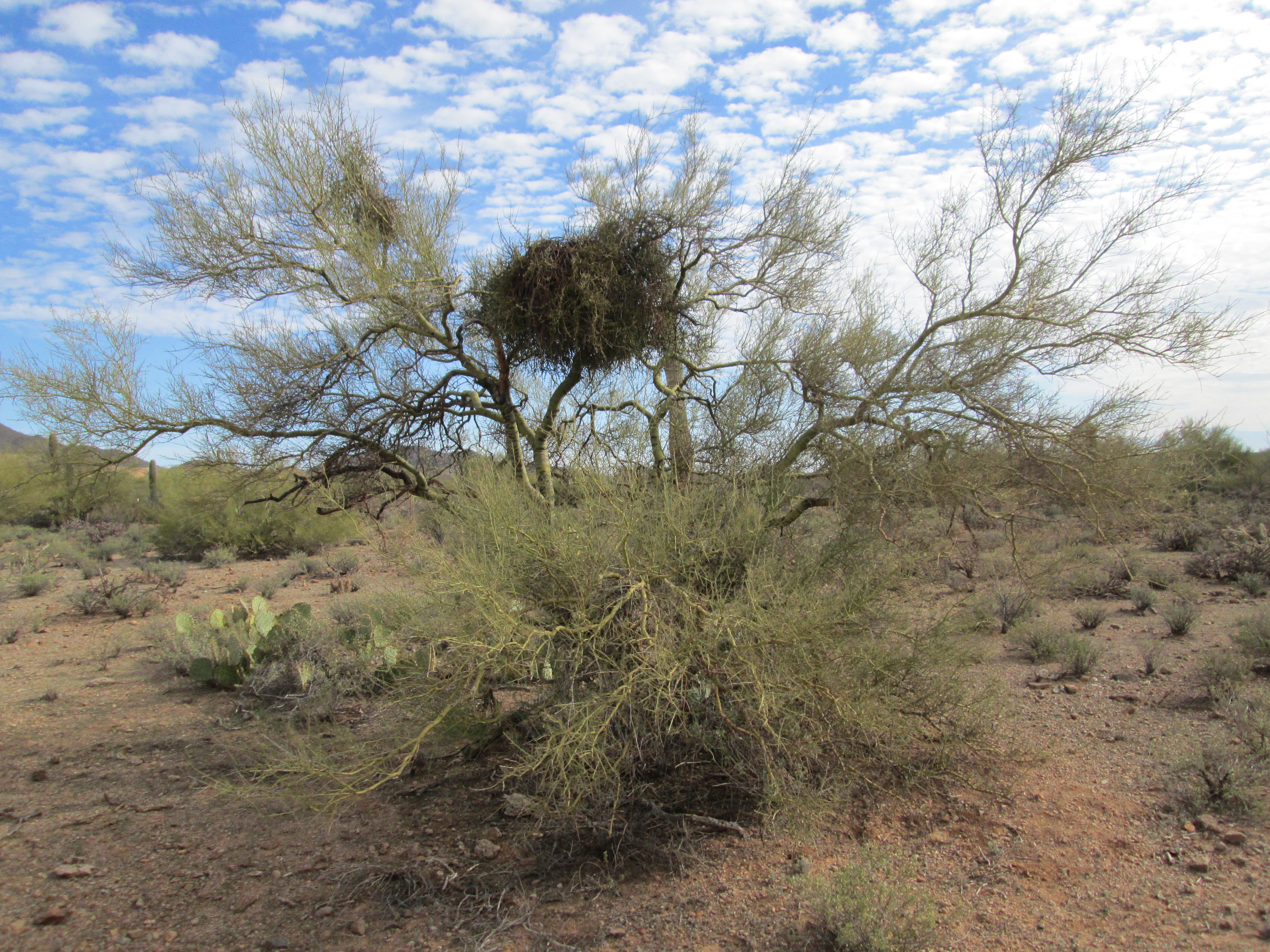
A palo verde tree with desert mistletoe in Arizona's Sonoran Desert.

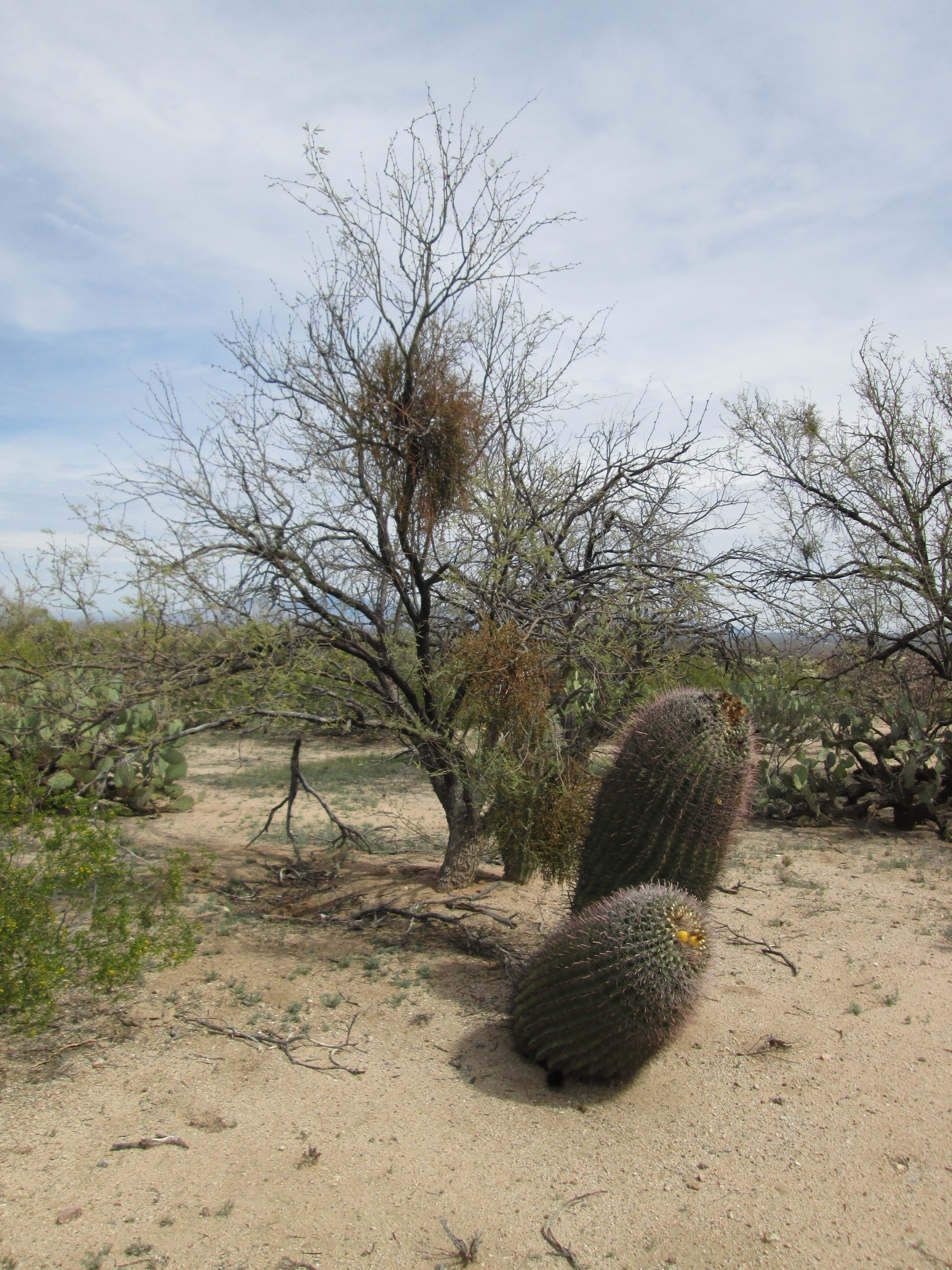
A mesquite tree with desert mistletoe in the Sonoran Desert.

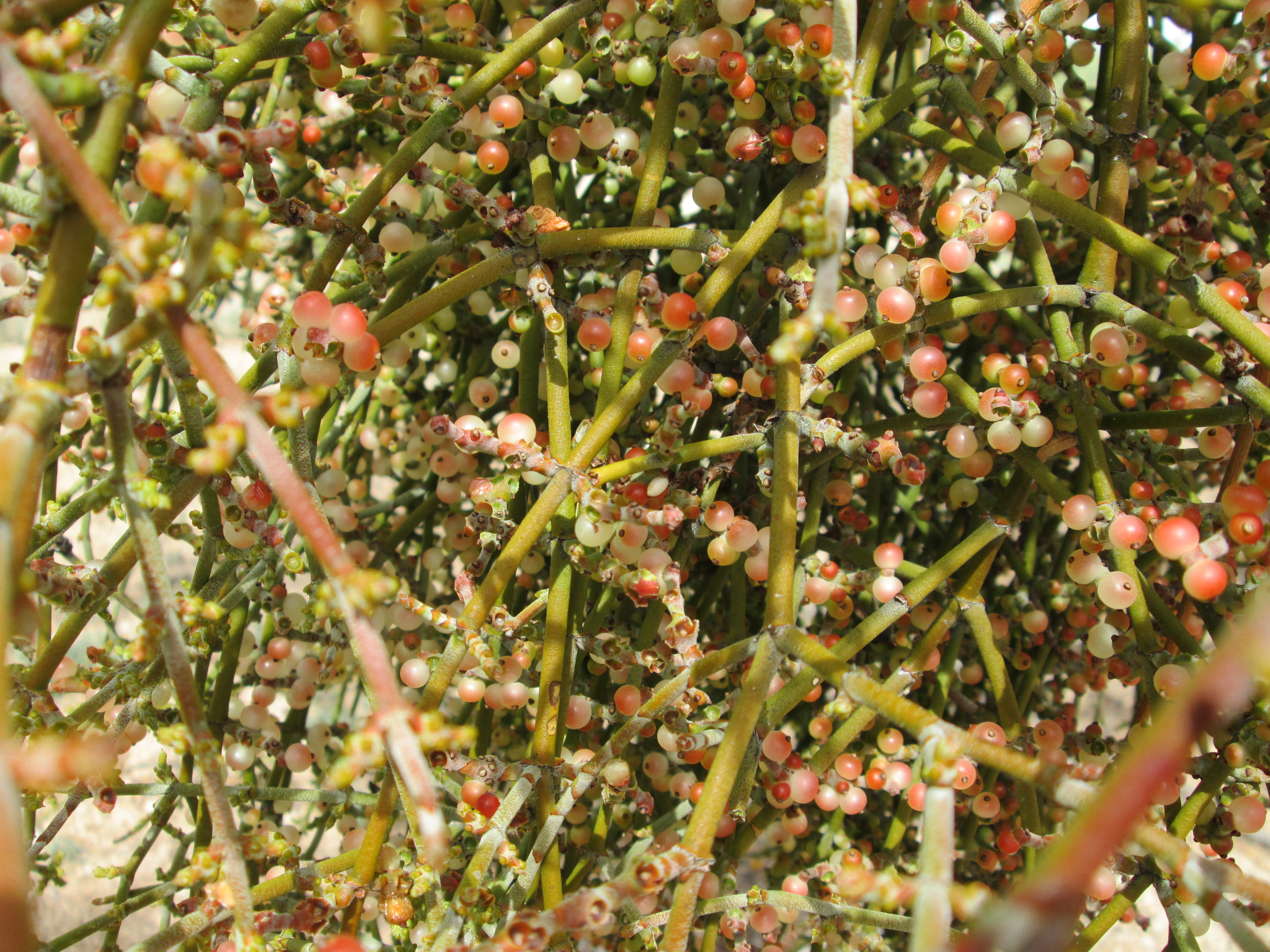
Close-up view of desert mistletoe.

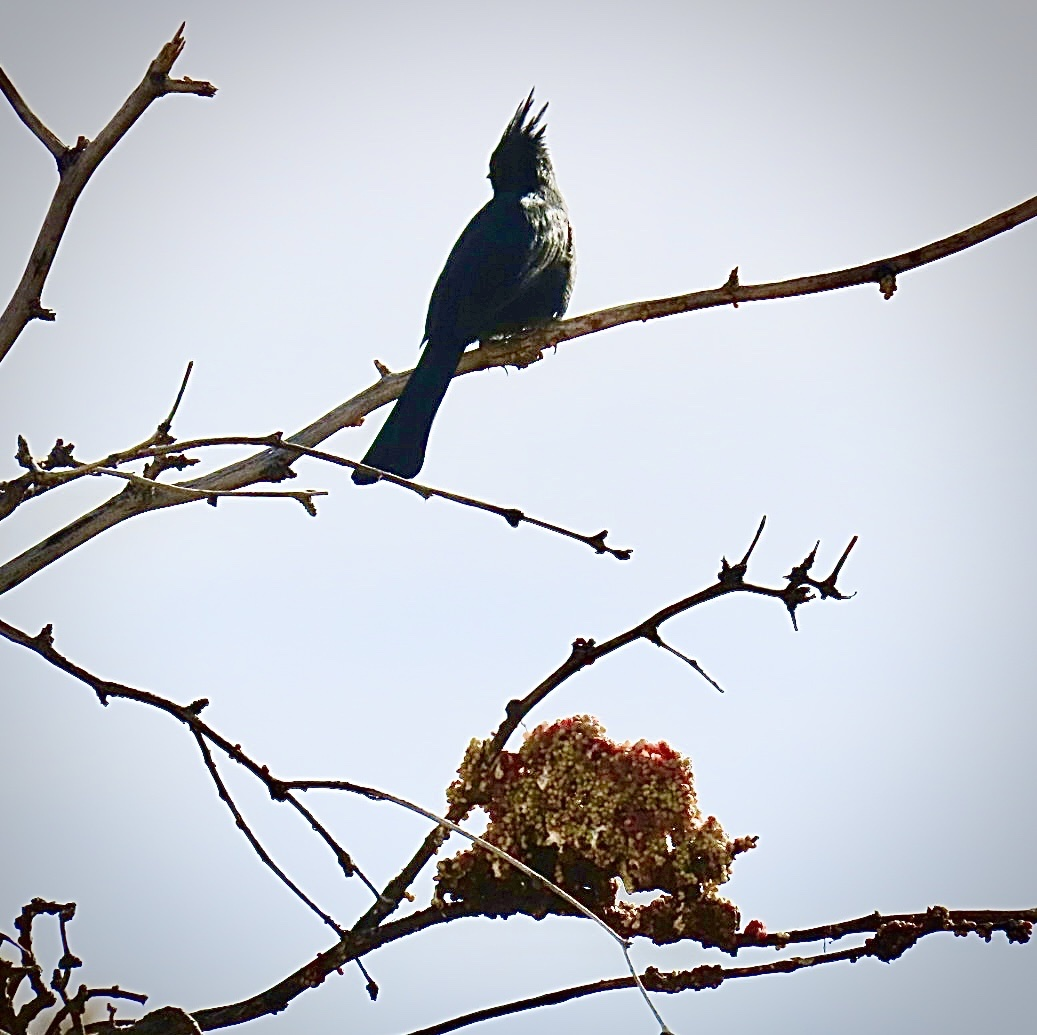
Phainopepla with feces
