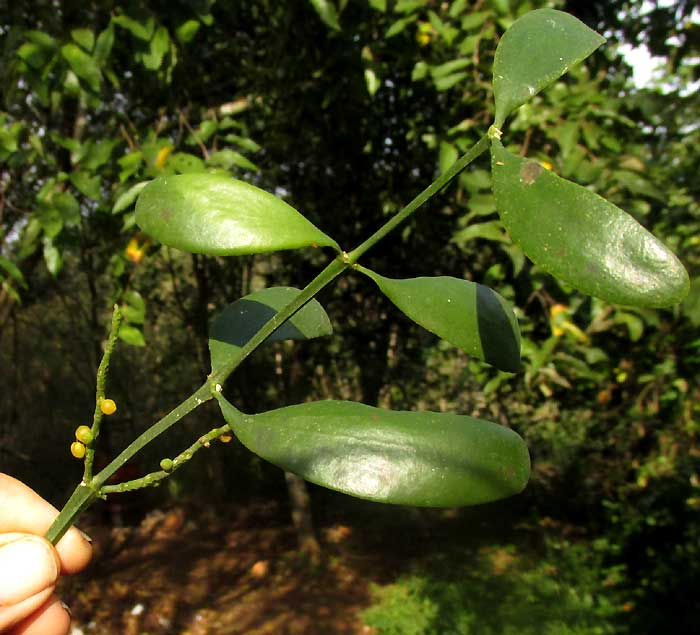
- Phoradendron quadrangulare leafy stem with fruits

Scientific classification
- Kingdom: Plantae
- Clade: Tracheophytes
- Clade: Angiosperms
- Clade: Eudicots
- Order: Santalales
- Family: Santalaceae
- Genus: Phoradendron
- Species: P. quadrangulare

Binomial name
- Phoradendron quadrangulare (Kunth) Griseb. 1864

Synonyms
- See text

= Phoradendron quadrangulare =

Species of plant

Phoradendron quadrangulare, with no commonly accepted English name other than mistletoe, which is shared with many other similar species, is an evergreen shrub partly parasitic on branches of woody plants; it belongs to the Family Santalaceae.

== Description ==
Phoradendron quadrangulare is easy to recognize as a mistletoe because it's a compactly growing shrub on tree branches. Among the approximately 270 accepted Phoradendron species, though a few other mistletoe species share the feature, its main field mark is that, except for the older ones, the stems are quadrangular in cross-section. The species is morphologically variable across its distribution area, with delicate to more robust plants, depending on the habitat. Here are some notable distinguishing features:

- Plants are monoecious -- with male and female flowers on the same individual.
- The plant body is hairless.
- Stem sections between where leaves arise, the internodes, are longish, up to 8 cm (3 in) long.
- Where stems branch, there are collar-like green items called cataphylls.
- Leaves either lack petioles or have them only up to 4 mm (0.16 in) long; blades are variable in shape, up to 6.5 cm (2.6 in) long and 2.5 cm (0.98 in) wide.
- Inflorescences are up to 4 cm (1.6 in) long with 2 to 5 segments, and 3 or 4 flowers per segment.
- Male flowers are infrequent and distributed irregularly.
- Berry-type fruits are spherical or nearly so, about 3 mm (0.12 in) in diameter, orangish or yellowish, smooth and hairless.

== Distribution ==
Phoradendron quadrangulare is native to Mexico, the Caribbean, south through Central America and as far south in South America as Argentina and Paraguay.

== Host species ==
In highland central Mexico, Phoradendron quadrangulare parasitizes a variety of hosts, including different members of the family Fabaceae, as well as species of Decatropis, Forestiera, Guazuma, Melia, Parmentiera and others.

== Ecology ==
In Brazil it's been asserted that Phoradendron quadrangulare seeds are almost exclusively dispersed by Euphonia bird species, which defecate seeds in clumps on host branches.

A study in Costa Rica of Phoradendron quadrangulare on Guazuma ulmifolia documented that the larger the host tree, the more likely it was to host the mistletoe.

Phoradendron quadrangulare is one of several Phoradendron species recognized as a hyperparasite -- a parasite whose host also is a parasite, sometimes the host belonging to the same genus.

== Use in traditional medicine ==
In Mexico, Phoradendron quadrangulare has been used as an antiviral treatment against Herpes zoster. Ground leaves are applied to the affected area, and above that a whole leaf is held in place by a bandage. Also it's used as an analgesic for muscular pain.

In Argentina, Phoradendron quadrangulare has been regarded as a treatment for cancer. Chemical analysis finds that compounds in the plant show antioxidant activity which can be explained by the presence of flavonoids and other active molecules.

Among the Mayan people of Mexico's Yucatan Peninsula, Phoradendron quadrangulare leaves have been documented used in combination with leaves of Talinum paniculatum and Phyllanthus amarus to treat a severe toothache. Below, it's shown how leaves from the three sources were mashed into a paste using a mortar and pestle, homemade with a whittled stick and the cut-off bottom of a 1-liter Coca-Cola bottle:

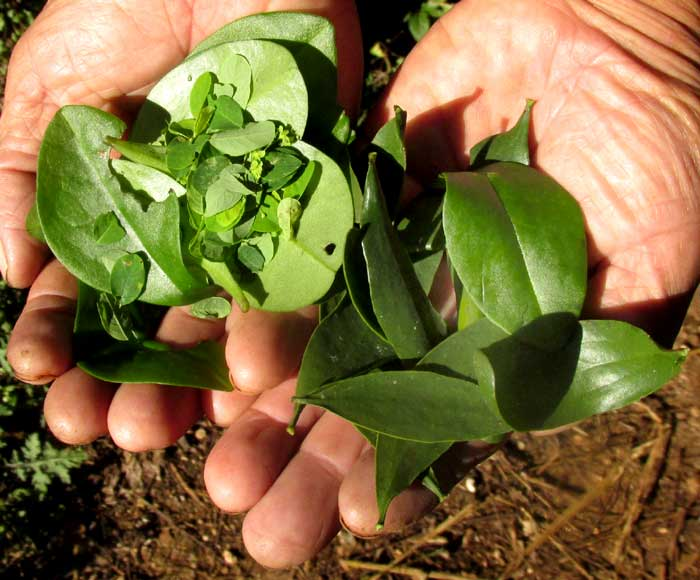
Phoradendron quadrangulare leaves with leaves of Talinum paniculatum and Phyllanthus amarus

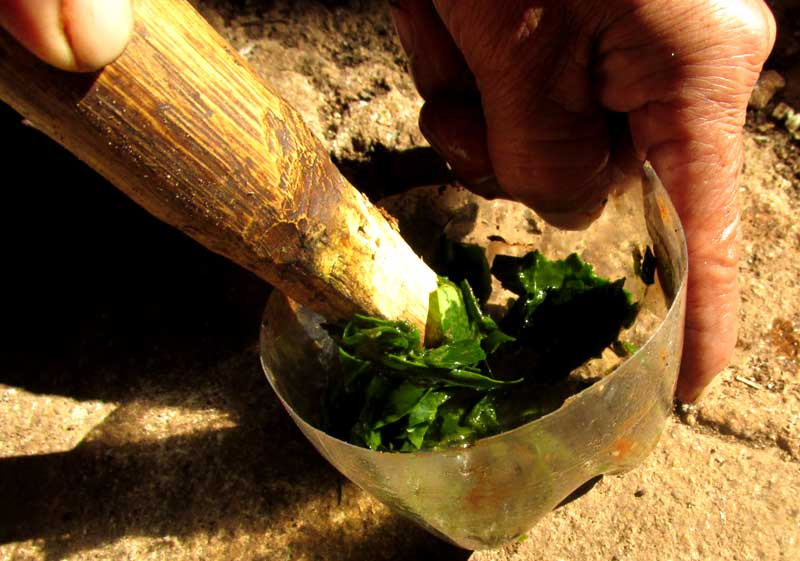
Mashing leaves into a pulp which was spread across the face's inflamed cheek skin

== Taxonomy ==
The basionym for Phoradendron quadrangulare is Loranthus quadrangularis, formally described by Carl Sigismund Kunth in 1820. The taxon was one of many first scientifically collected by Aimé Bonpland and Alexander von Humboldt during their visit to the Republic of New Granada, mainly now known as the countries of Panama and Colombia, in northern South America. The collection was made at a temperate elevation near Pandi and Fusagasugá.

=== Synonyms ===
In March 2026, the follow synonyms were recognized for Phoradendron quadrangulare:

- Loranthus quadrangularis Kunth (1820)
- Viscum quadrangulare (Kunth) DC. (1830)
- Loranthus viscifolius Kunth (1820)
- Phoradendron antillarum Trel. (1916)
- Phoradendron antillarum f. longum Trel. (1916)
- Phoradendron antillarum var. orientale Trel. (1916)
- Phoradendron belizense Trel. (1936)
- Phoradendron cayanum Trel. (1936)
- Phoradendron ceibanum Trel. (1916)
- Phoradendron cocquericotanum Trel. (1936)
- Phoradendron commutatum Trel. (1916)
- Phoradendron franciscanum Trel. (1937)
- Phoradendron gaumeri Trel. (1916)
- Phoradendron gracile (Krug & Urb.) Trel. (1916)
- Phoradendron gracile var. ballii Trel. (1916)
- Phoradendron guazumae Trel. (1916)
- Phoradendron herrerense Trel. (1940)
- Phoradendron huricola Trel. (1927)
- Phoradendron libertadanum Trel. (1937)
- Phoradendron manatense Trel. (1936)
- Phoradendron martianum Trel. (1916)
- Phoradendron millspaughii Trel. (1927)
- Phoradendron moringicola Trel. (1929)
- Phoradendron paquitanum Trel. (1937)
- Phoradendron petenense Trel. (1937)
- Phoradendron quadrangulare var. avenia Hieron. ex Trel. (1916)
- Phoradendron quadrangulare var. gracile Krug & Urb. (1897)
- Phoradendron randiae (Bello) Britton (1924)
- Phoradendron randiae f. longum (Trel.) Stehlé (1954)
- Phoradendron randiae var. orientale (Trel.) Stehlé (1954)
- Phoradendron rehderianum Urb. (1930)
- Phoradendron rensonii Trel. (1916)
- Phoradendron rubrum var. gracile (Krug & Urb.) Fawc. & Rendle (1914)
- Phoradendron rusbyanum Trel. (1927)
- Phoradendron salicifolium (C.Presl) Eichler (1868)
- Phoradendron sonanum Trel. (1940)
- Phoradendron tamaulipense Trel. (1916)
- Phoradendron townsendii Trel. (1916)
- Phoradendron venezuelense Trel. (1916)
- Phoradendron venezuelense var. filispicum Rizzini (1984)
- Phoradendron viscifolium (Kunth) Trel. (1916)
- Phoradendron zacapanum Trel. (1916)
- Viscum angustifolium Bertero ex Spreng. (1824)
- Viscum kunthianum DC. (1830)
- Viscum randiae Bello (1881)
- Viscum salicifolium C.Presl (1851)
- Viscum trigonum D.Dietr. (1839)

=== Etymology ===
The genus name Phoradendron is based on the Greek phor, meaning "thief", and dendron, for "tree", alluding to the taxon's parasitism.

The species name quadrangularis is New Latin based on the Latin quadrangulum, meaning "quadrangle", and the suffix -aris, serving as the suffix "-ar" in English, thus "quadrangular", referring to the taxon's quadrangular young stems.

== Gallery ==
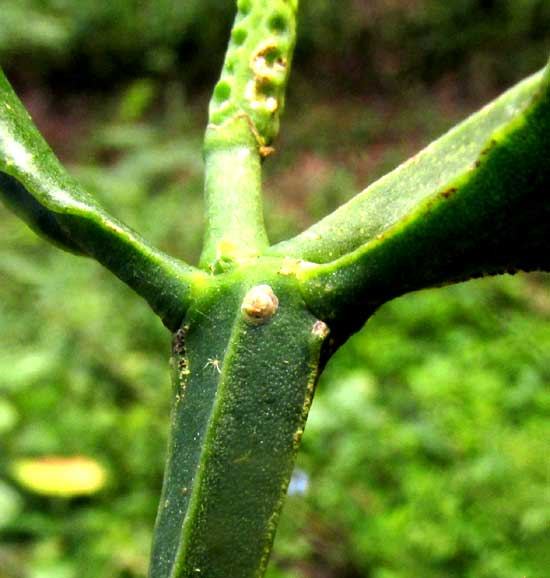
Phoradendron quadrangulare quadrangular stems

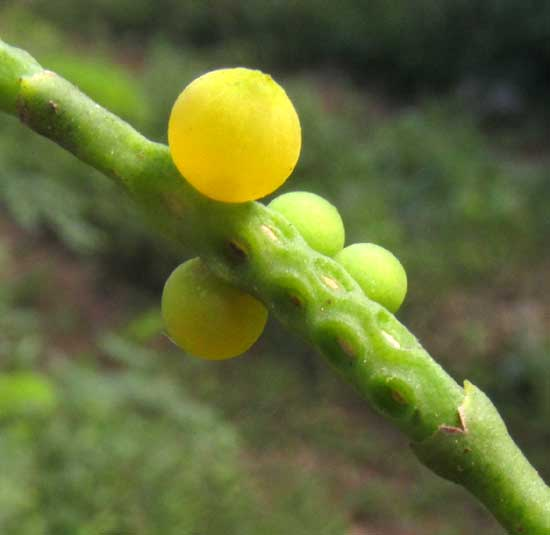
Phoradendron quadrangulare berry-type fruits

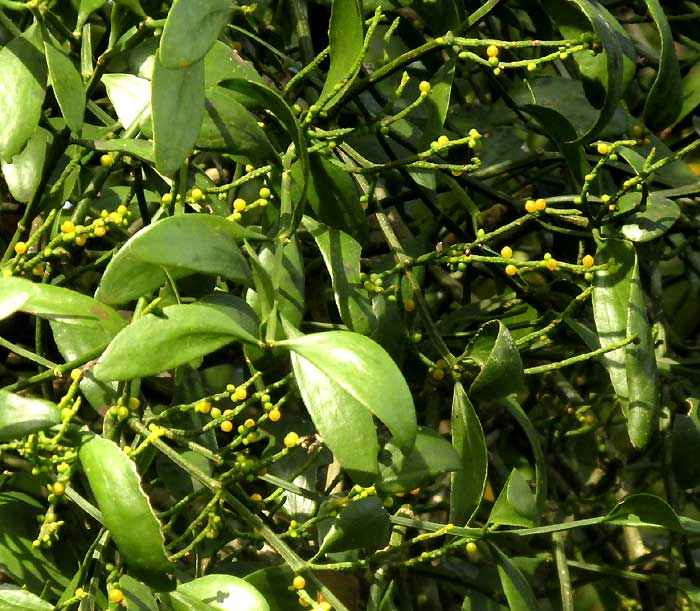
Phoradendron quadrangulare leafy stems with inflorescences

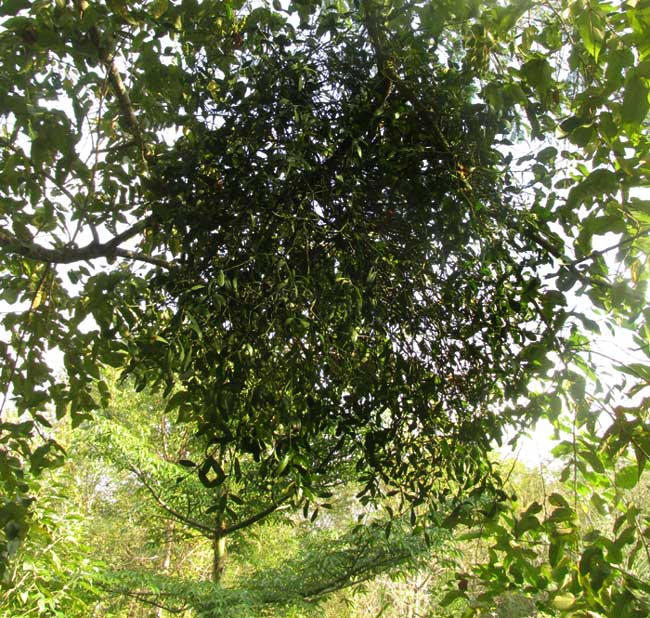
Phoradendron quadrangulare on host branch of Guazuma ulmifolia
