= Phoradendron aequatoris =

Conservation status
- Critically Endangered (IUCN 3.1)

Scientific classification
- Kingdom: Plantae
- Clade: Tracheophytes
- Clade: Angiosperms
- Clade: Eudicots
- Order: Santalales
- Family: Santalaceae
- Genus: Phoradendron
- Species: P. aequatoris

Binomial name
- Phoradendron aequatoris Urb.

Species of flowering plant

Phoradendron aequatoris is a species of plant in the Santalaceae family. It is endemic to Ecuador. Its natural habitat is subtropical or tropical moist lowland forests.
