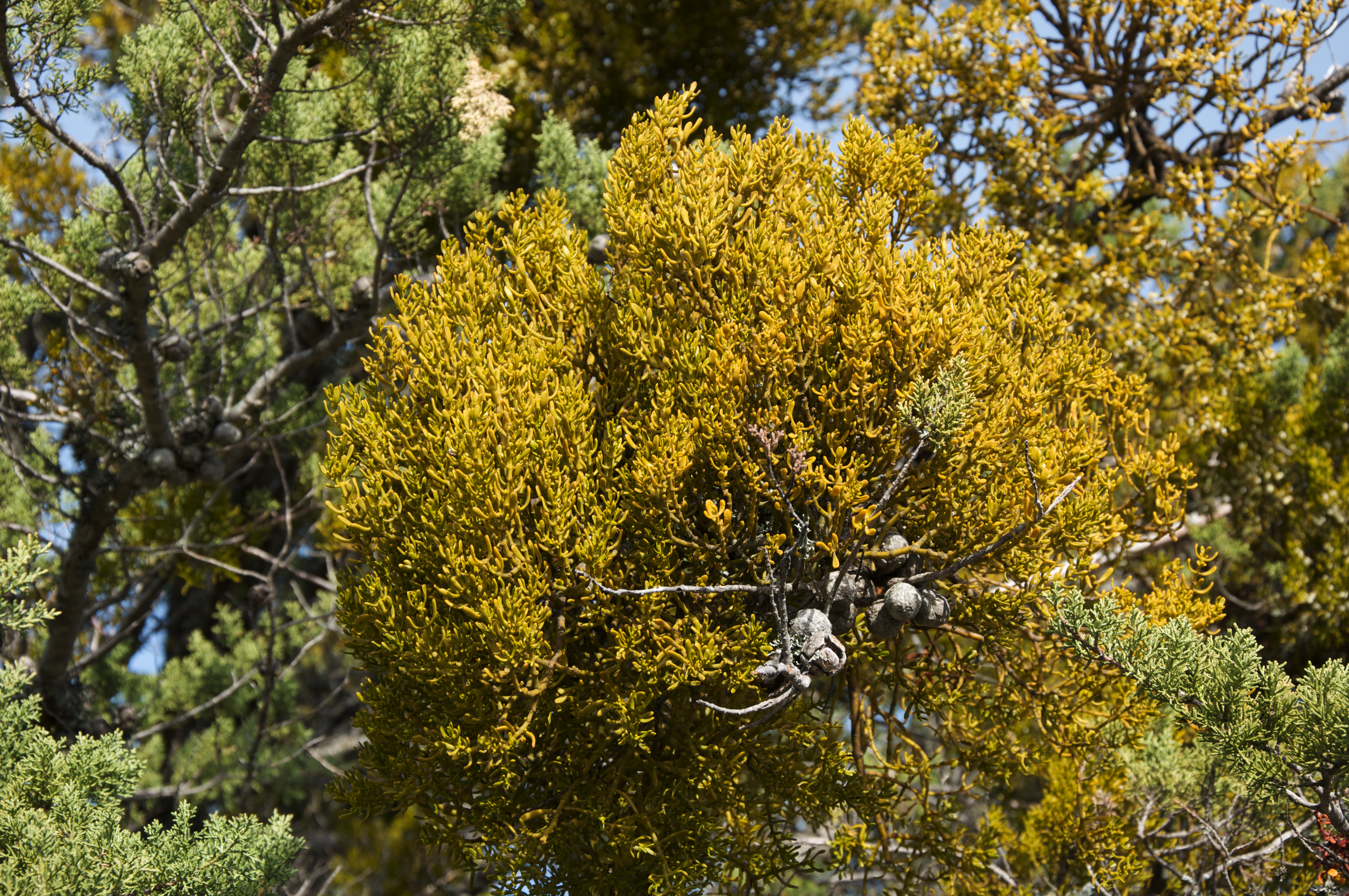

Scientific classification
- Kingdom: Plantae
- Clade: Tracheophytes
- Clade: Angiosperms
- Clade: Eudicots
- Order: Santalales
- Family: Santalaceae
- Genus: Phoradendron
- Species: P. bolleanum

Binomial name
- Phoradendron bolleanum (Seem.) Eichl.

= Phoradendron bolleanum =

Species of flowering plant

Phoradendron bolleanum, commonly called Bollean mistletoe, is a species of plant in the sandalwood family that is native to the desert southwest, California and southern Oregon in the United States and Mexico.

It is a hemiparasite found on trees in the genera Juniperus and Arbutus.
