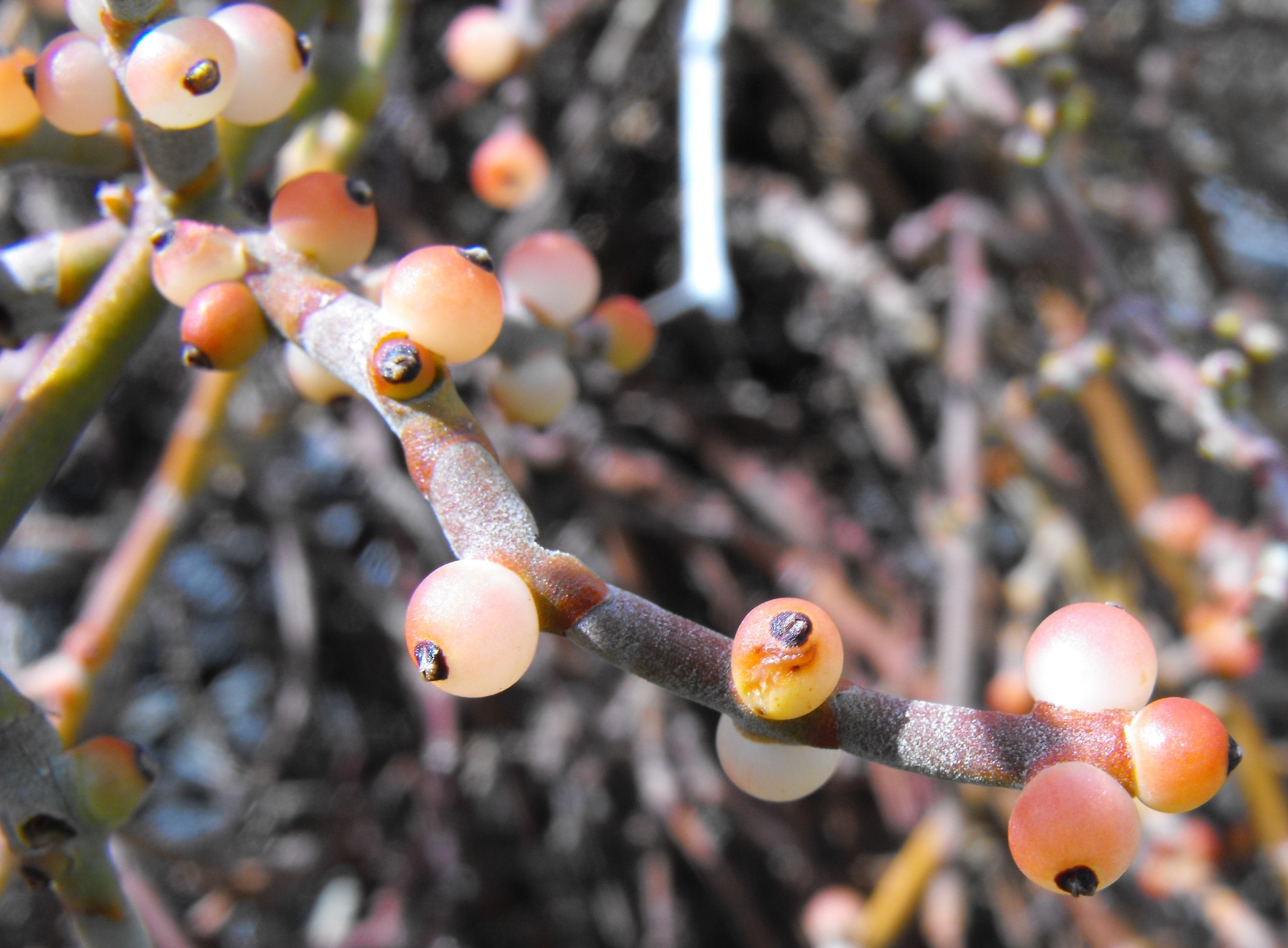
- Phoradendron californicum fruit

Scientific classification
- Kingdom: Plantae
- Clade: Tracheophytes
- Clade: Angiosperms
- Clade: Eudicots
- Order: Santalales
- Family: Santalaceae
- Genus: Phoradendron; Nutt.

Species
- About 235-240 species; see text
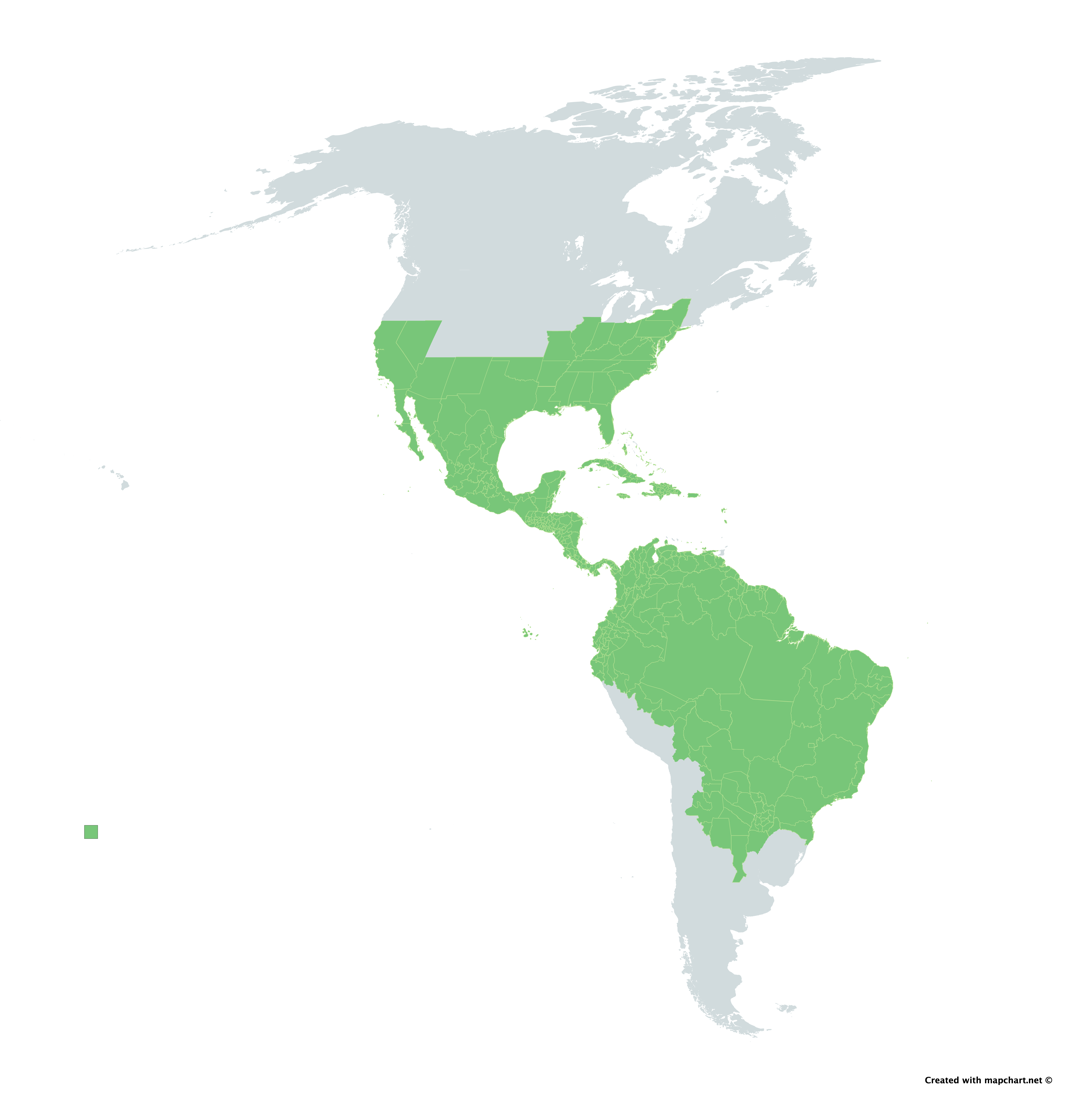
- Phoradendron distribution by state or province.

Synonyms
- Allobium Miers; Spiciviscum Engelm.

= Phoradendron =

Genus of mistletoes

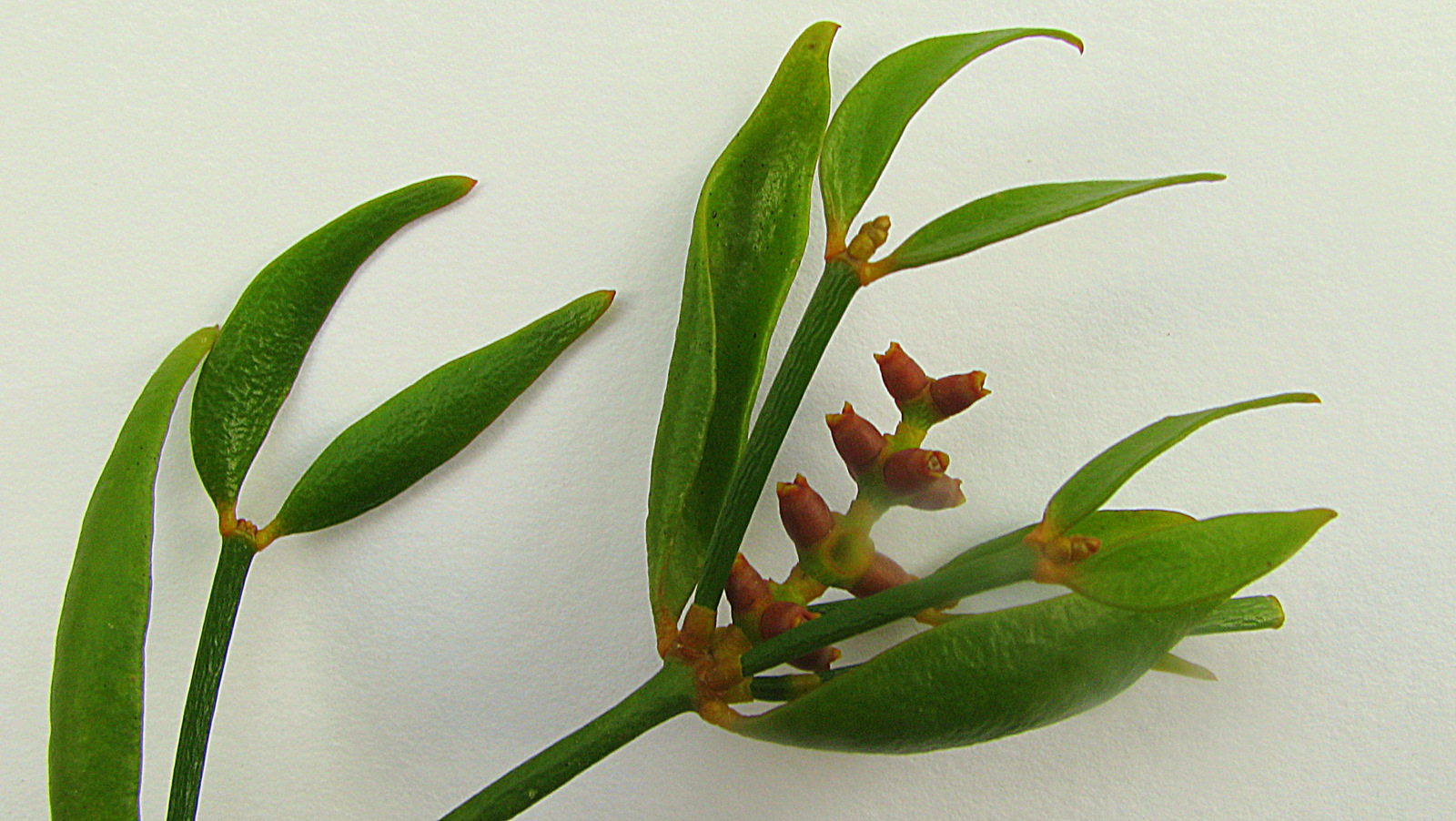
Phoradendron strongyloclados showing leathery leaves and an inflorescence resulting from one apical meristem.

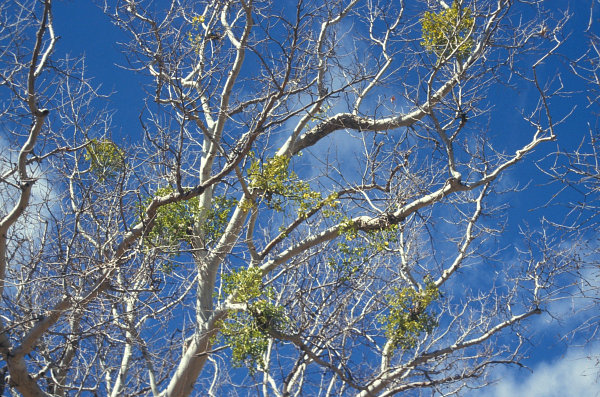
Phoradendron macrophylla in Arizona sycamore

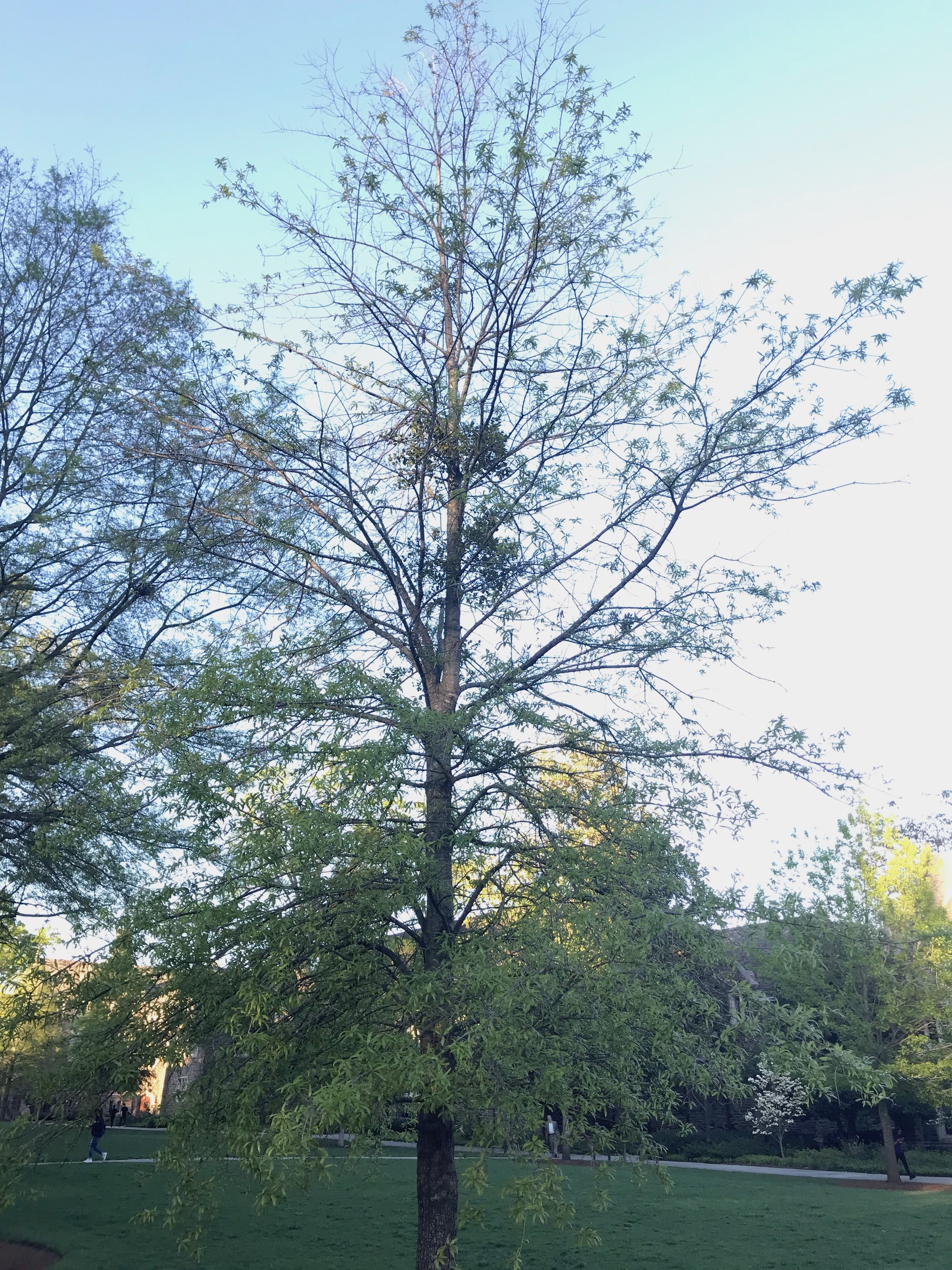
Multiple Phoradendron individuals parasitizing an oak tree. While lower branches show new leaf growth, the mistletoe appears to be negatively affecting the tree's budding in the upper branches.

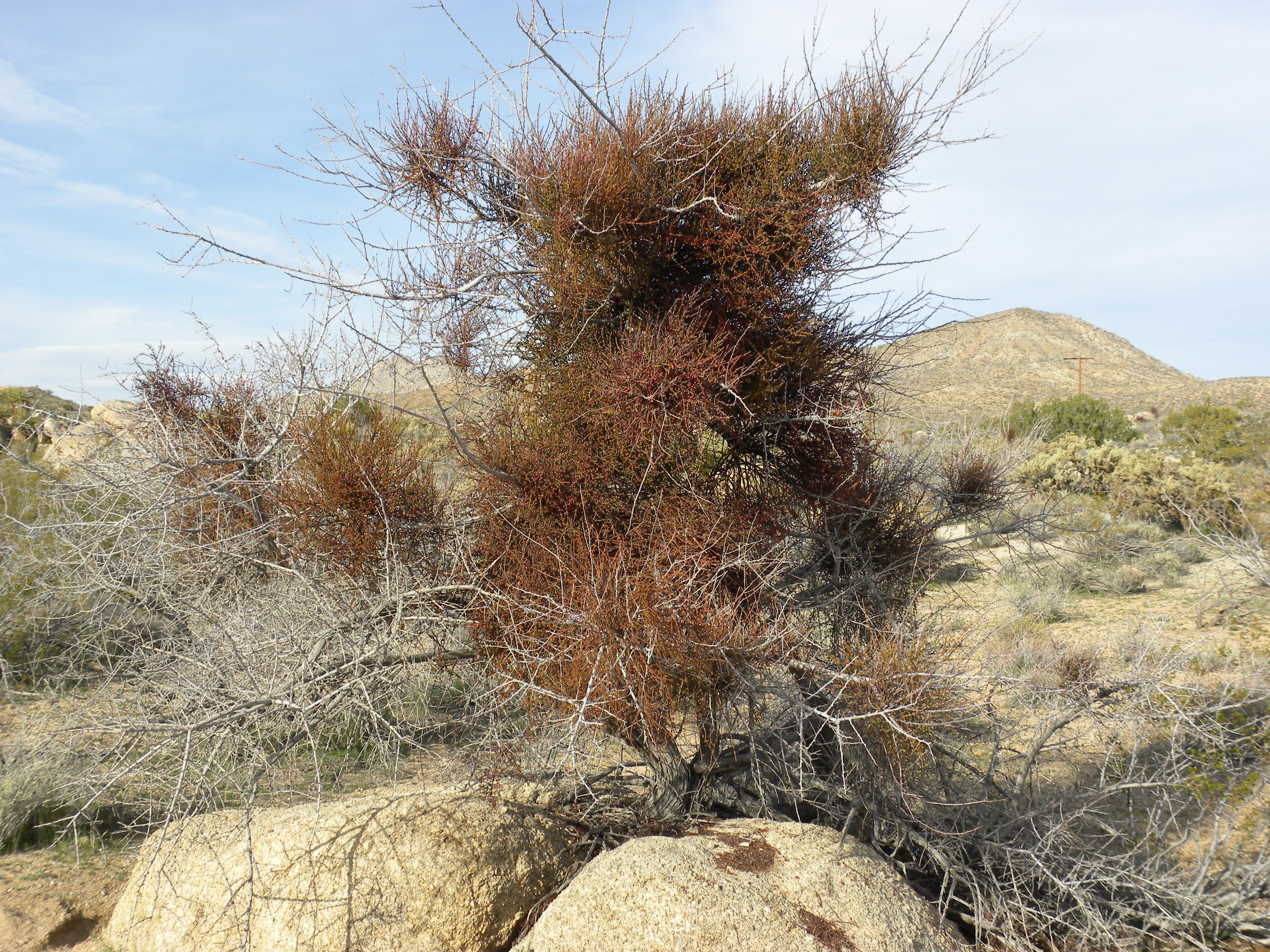
Phoradendron californicum (Desert Mistletoe), Granite Mountains, Mojave Desert, California

Phoradendron is a genus of mistletoe, native to warm temperate and tropical regions of the Americas. The center of diversity is the Amazon rainforest. Phoradendron is the largest genus of mistletoe in the Americas, and possibly the largest genus of mistletoes in the world. Traditionally, the genus has been placed in the family Viscaceae, but recent genetic research acknowledged by the Angiosperm Phylogeny Group shows this family to be correctly placed within a larger circumscription of the sandalwood family, Santalaceae.

They are woody hemi-parasitic shrubs with branches 10–80 cm (3.9–31.5 in) long, which grow on other trees. The foliage is dichotomously branching, with opposite pairs of leaves; these are fairly large, 2–5 cm (0.79–1.97 in) long, green and photosynthetic in some species (e.g. P. leucarpum), but minimal in some others (e.g. P. californicum). Although they are able to photosynthesize the plant relies on its host for some nutrients. The plant draws its mineral and water needs, and some of its energy needs, from the host tree using a haustorium which grows into the stems of the host.

The flowers are inconspicuous and incomplete, no petals and 3-4 greenish-yellow sepals, 1–3 mm (0.039–0.118 in) diameter. The fruit is a berry, white, yellow, orange, or red when mature, containing one to several seeds embedded in very sticky juice, called viscin. The flowers are unisexual, and depending on the species, the plant will be monoecious or dioecious (both male and female flowers on a single plant or male and female plants with only one sex of flowers). The seeds are dispersed when birds eat the fruit and remove the sticky seeds from their bills by wiping them on tree branches where they can germinate.

The foliage and berries of some species are toxic. Leafy mistletoes seldom kill but they cause stress reducing crop productions in fruits and nut trees.

Phoradendron plants can be distinguished from mistletoes in other genera in Viscaceae by their inflorescences, which lack leaves and come from a single branching point or apical meristem. However, it can be difficult to identify species within Phoradendron, because leaf shape and color can vary greatly even within species.

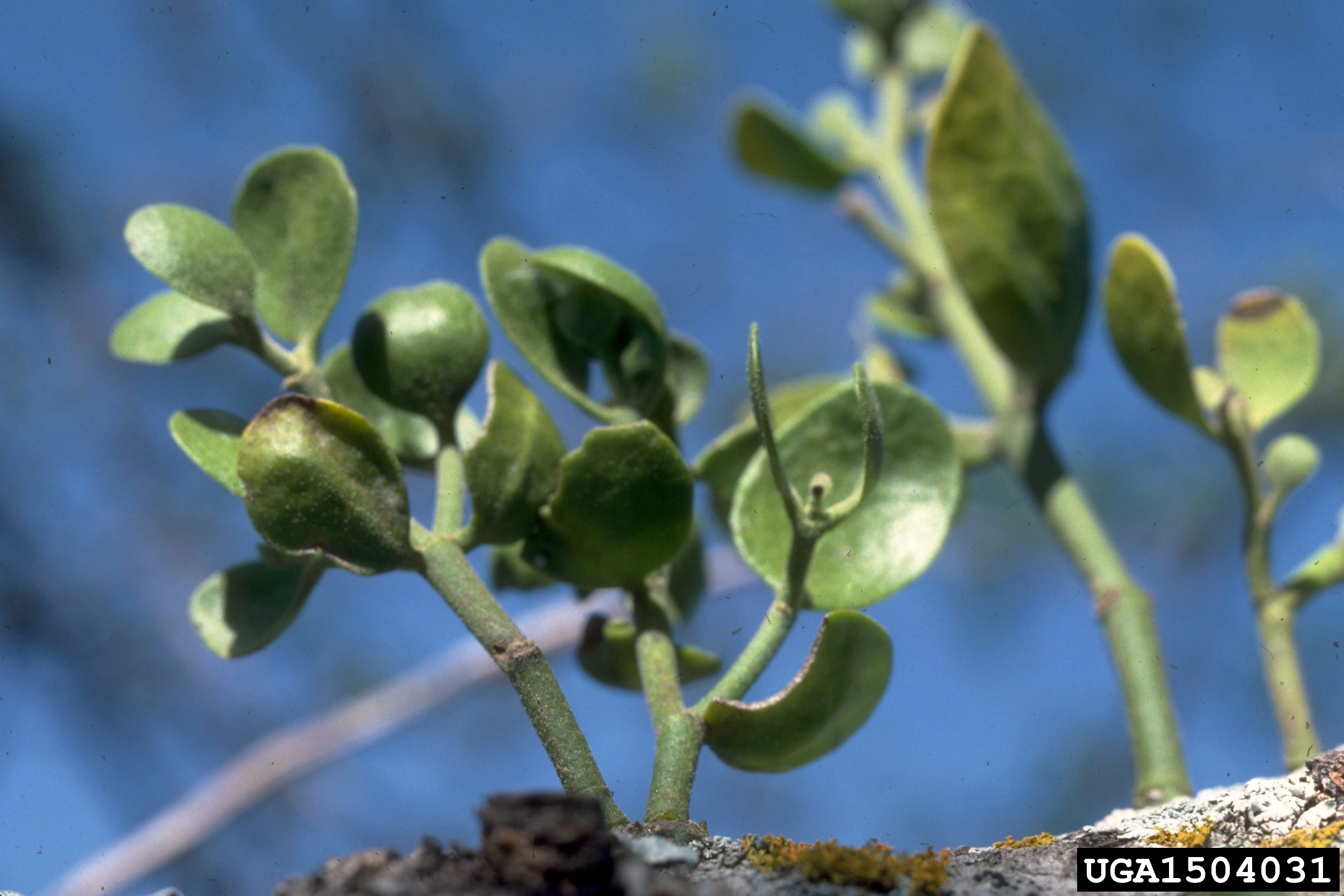
Phoradendron sp. on Spanish oak

== Host and symptoms ==
Phoradendron species can infest many taxa of plants including hackberry (Celtis spp.) mesquite (Prosopsis spp.), cedar, elm (Ulmus spp.), and Osage-orange. Certain species of Phoradendron are host-specific; for example, in Arizona, Phoradendron tomentosum infests cottonwood (Populus fremontii), sycamore (Platanus wrightii), ash (Fraxinus spp.), walnut (Juglans spp.) and willow (Salix spp.). P. californicum infests shrubs and trees such as acacia (Acacia spp.) and blue palo verde (Parkinsonia florida). Some species infest junipers (Juniperus spp.) and oaks (Quercus spp.). Branches often become swollen and distorted, forming burls and making the tree more susceptible to insect attack. Phoradendron presents serious problems along rivers, streams, parks, and golf courses with large cottonwood trees. Deciduous trees can be mistaken for evergreens during the winter if infection is heavy. Other common symptoms include swelling formations of witch's broom, dieback, and weakened branches.

== Life cycle ==
Phoradendron species are hemiparasites which produce their own chlorophyll but rely on the host plant to provide water, minerals, and other nutrients. Birds are the primary means of dispersal of the parasite. Birds consume the drupes of the mistletoe and excrete or regurgitate the seeds onto the branches of the host plant. The seeds do not need to be ingested to germinate. Germinating seeds produce a radicle, a holdfast, and eventually the germinated seeds produce haustoria. The haustorium is a root-like structure that penetrates the host plant's bark and cambium, reaching the xylem and phloem where it extracts water and minerals, primarily carbon and nitrogen compounds. A study on the nutrient ratio between Phoradendron and their hosts found that the parasite have higher concentrations of nitrogen and minerals, especially in leguminous hosts. This suggests that the parasite actively draws nutrients from the host plant through both the xylem and phloem, challenging the alternative theory of the passive uptake of nutrients by the parasite from the host xylem only. The most important birds for effective dispersal include the cedar waxwing, euphonias, silky-flycatchers, bluebirds, and thrushes.

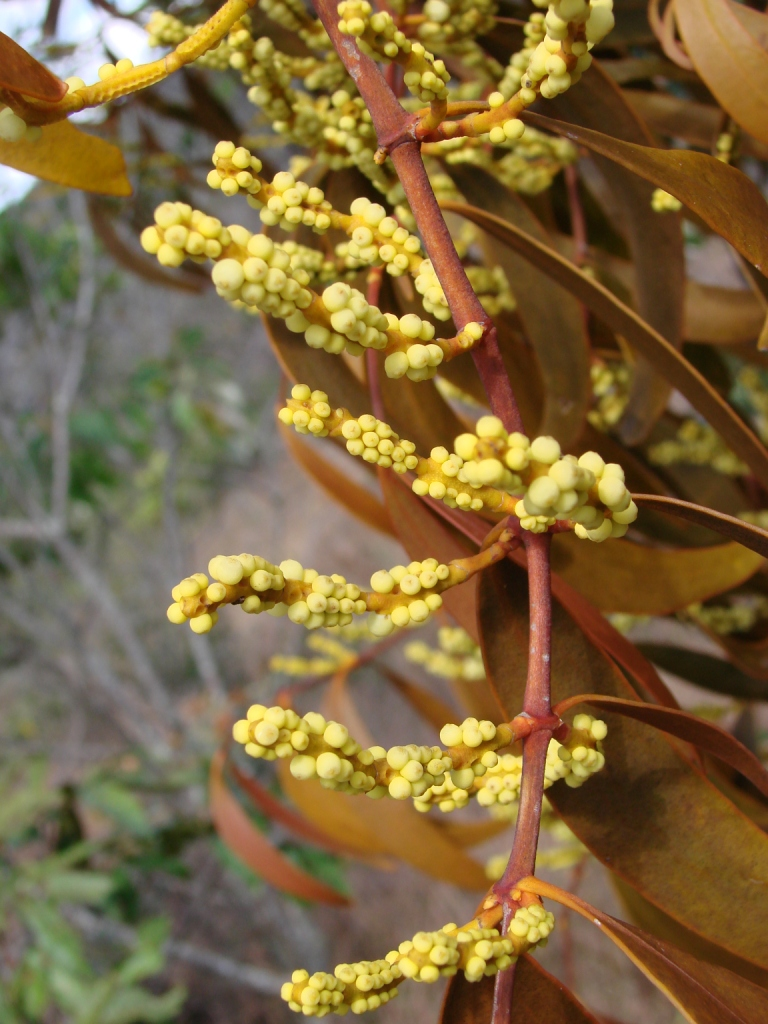
Phoradendron caripense

== Management ==
Leafy mistletoe can adversely affect trees growing in urban environments and in forests. It is considered a nuisance in urban environments because of its appearance on deciduous trees during winter. Severe colonization of mistletoe can affect the health of an individual tree, and a tree already stressed by other factors can be killed. Forest fragmentation can increase Phoradendron infection rates in some oak trees, as trees in lower density forests and those closer to the forests' edges are more likely to be colonized by the mistletoe. Control and management regimes include watering the host plant to improve its vigor, and removing infested vegetation. Pruning infested branches is not generally effective because the haustoria can infiltrate deeply. Plucking the mistletoe herbage is a temporary treatment because it easily resprouts, but keeping its herbage sparse can help to reduce its seed production.

== Wildlife & human uses ==
Phoradendron species are larval host plants for a number of Lepidoptera. The buckthorn duskywing (Erynnis pacuvius) feeds on Phoradendron californicum.

Phoradendron are the preferred food of the Phainopepla, a silky-flycatcher. The male defends territories where fruiting mistletoe is abundant.

There may actually be some mutualistic interactions between the parasite and the host in some Phoradendron species. The presence of Phoradendron juniperinum on host Juniperus monosperma, for example, has been suggested to increase dispersal of the host's seeds by birds. The mistletoe berries may attract frugivorous birds (e.g. thrushes) to eat the host juniper's seeds and disperse them. The net benefit on the hosts is difficult to quantify, however. The birds dispersing the host's seeds and benefiting the host, while at the same time dispersing the mistletoe's seeds and spreading the Phoradendron infection.

Phoradendron californicum was used by Native American peoples as a food and medicinal remedy.

Some Phoradendron species, such as Phoradendron serotinum and Phoradendron flavescens, are used in North America as Christmas decoration, substituting for the European mistletoe Viscum album. They are harvested commercially for that purpose.

== Etymology ==
Nuttall named the genus Phoradendron from the Greek, phor (a thief) and dendron (tree), alluding to the genus' parasitic habit.

== Taxonomy ==
There are roughly 235 to 240 species in the genus.

Species include:

- Phoradendron aequatoris Urb.
- Phoradendron anceps (Spreng.) G.Maza – goldenfruit mistletoe
- Phoradendron argentinum
- Phoradendron barahonae Urb. & Trel. – island mistletoe
- Phoradendron bolleanum (Seem.) Eichl. – Bollean mistletoe
- Phoradendron californicum Nutt. – desert mistletoe, mesquite mistletoe
- Phoradendron canzacotoi Trel.
- Phoradendron capitellatum Torr. ex Trel. – downy mistletoe or hairy mistletoe
- Phoradendron coryae Trel. – oak mistletoe
- Phoradendron crassifolium
- Phoradendron densum Torr. ex Trel. – dense mistletoe
- Phoradendron dichotomum (Bertero) Krug & Urb. – Bertero's mistletoe
- Phoradendron emarginatum
- Phoradendron flavescens same as Phoradendron leucarpum
- Phoradendron hawksworthii (DC.) Griseb. – Hawksworth's mistletoe
- Phoradendron hexastichum (DC.) Griseb. – tropical mistletoe
- Phoradendron hieronymi
- Phoradendron juniperinum A.Gray – juniper mistletoe
- Phoradendron leucarpum (Raf.) Reveal & M.C.Johnst. (syn. P. flavescens, P. serotinum, P. tomentosum) – oak mistletoe, eastern mistletoe; grows in the west as also in a line down the east from New Jersey to Florida.
- Phoradendron libocedri (Engelm.) Howell – incense-cedar mistletoe
- Phoradendron liga
- Phoradendron macrophyllum (Engelm.) Cockerell – Colorado Desert mistletoe or big-leaf mistletoe
- Phoradendron madisonii Kuijt
- Phoradendron mathiasenii
- Phoradendron mucronatum (DC.) Krug & Urban – needletip mistletoe
- Phoradendron nickrentianum Kuijt
- Phoradendron olae
- Phoradendron pauciflorum Torr. – fir mistletoe
- Phoradendron piperoides (Kunth) Trel. – Piper mistletoe
- Phoradendron pomasquianum Trel.
- Phoradendron quadrangulare (Kunth) Griseb.
- Phoradendron racemosum (Aubl.) Krug & Urb. – bigleaf mistletoe
- Phoradendron rubrum (L.) Griseb. – mahogany mistletoe
- Phoradendron serotinum same as Phoradendron leucarpum.
- Phoradendron tetrapterum Krug & Urb. – fourpart mistletoe
- Phoradendron tomentosum (Lam.) Griseb. – leafy mistletoe; see Phoradendron leucarpum
- Phoradendron trinervium (Lam.) Griseb. – angled mistletoe
- Phoradendron tucumanense
- Phoradendron villosum (Nutt.) Nutt. – Pacific mistletoe
- Phoradendron wiensii Kuijt
