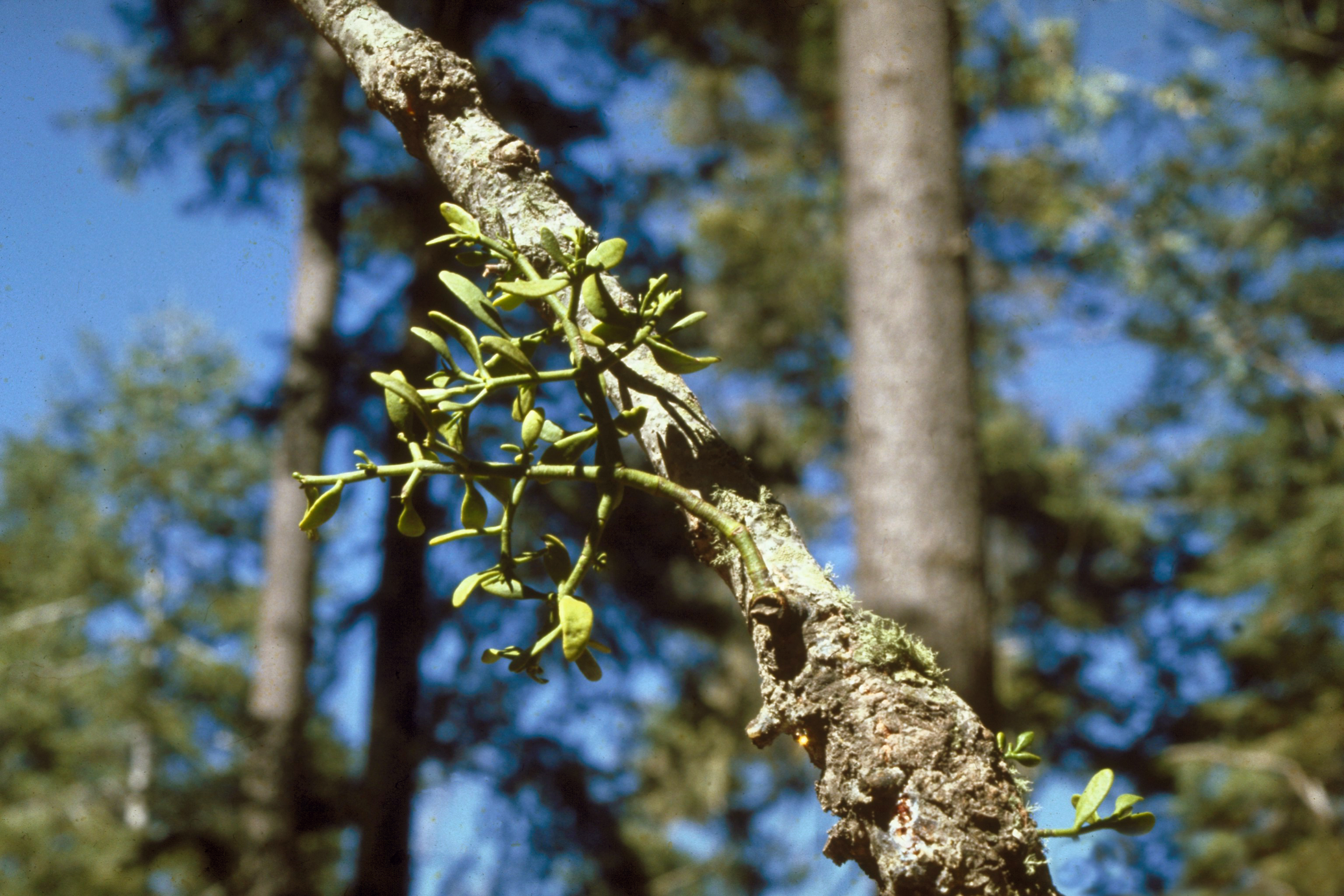
- fir mistletoe growing on a fir branch

Scientific classification
- Kingdom: Plantae
- Clade: Tracheophytes
- Clade: Angiosperms
- Clade: Eudicots
- Order: Santalales
- Family: Santalaceae
- Genus: Phoradendron
- Species: P. pauciflorum

Binomial name
- Phoradendron pauciflorum Torr.

= Phoradendron pauciflorum =

Species of flowering plant

Phoradendron pauciflorum is a species of flowering plant in the sandalwood family known by the common name fir mistletoe. It is native to coniferous forests in California, Arizona, and Baja California.

This mistletoe is a parasitic plant on its single known host tree, the white fir (Abies concolor). It is a shrub producing many erect green branches which can exceed half a meter long. Its stems are lined with pairs of small, oppositely arranged leaves with widely lance-shaped blades up to 2.5 centimeters long.

As a hemiparasite, the mistletoe taps its host tree for water and nutrients but contains some chlorophyll and can photosynthesize some energy for itself as well. The plant is dioecious, with male and female individuals producing different forms of inflorescence. Female flowers yield yellowish to light pink spherical berries each about 4 millimeters wide.
