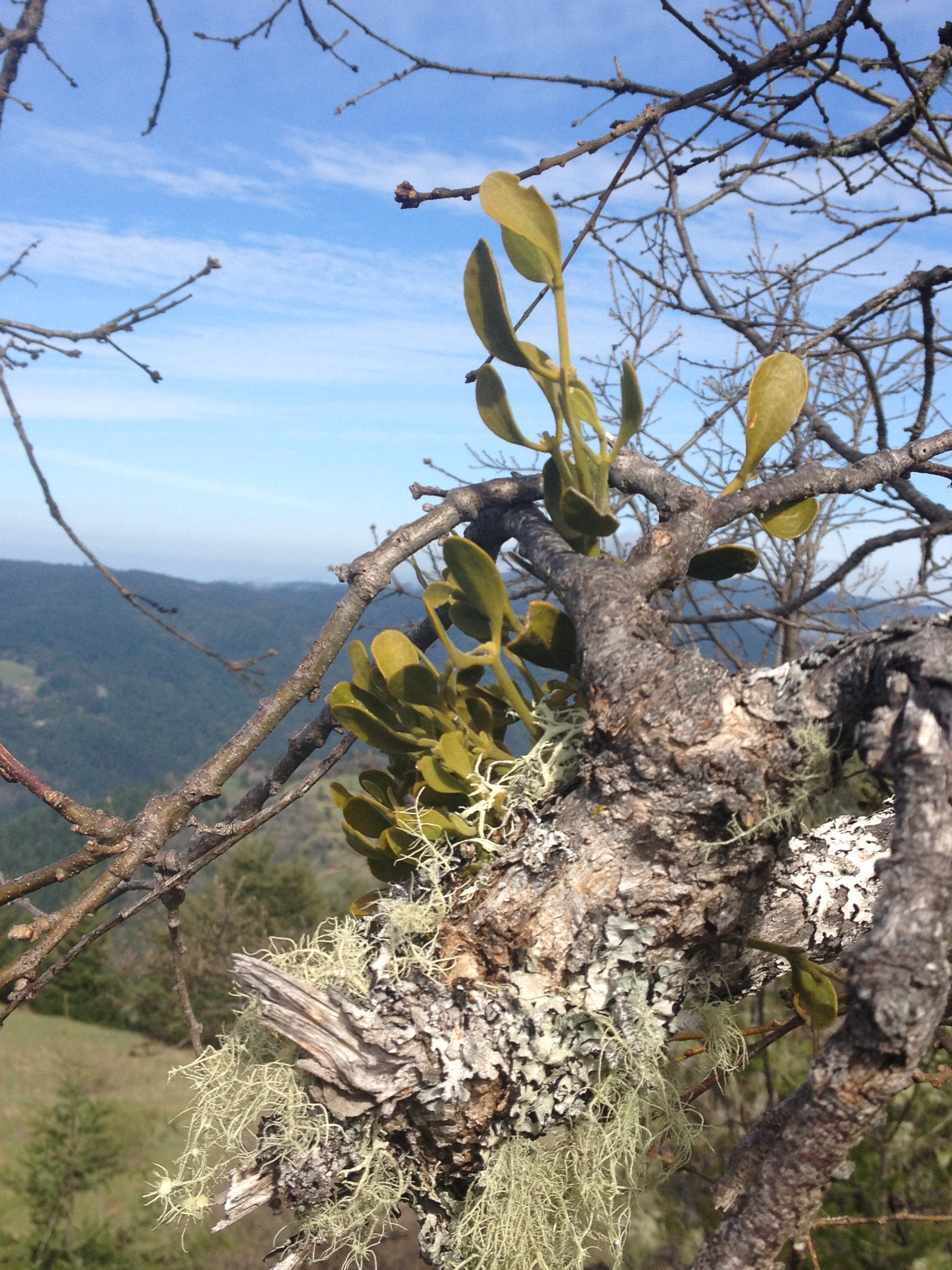
- Phoradendron tomentosum growing on Quercus garryana in Berry Point, CA

Conservation status
- Secure (NatureServe)

Scientific classification
- Kingdom: Plantae
- Clade: Tracheophytes
- Clade: Angiosperms
- Clade: Eudicots
- Order: Santalales
- Family: Santalaceae
- Genus: Phoradendron
- Species: P. tomentosum

Binomial name
- Phoradendron tomentosum (DC.) Engelm. ex A.Gray

= Phoradendron tomentosum =

Species of mistletoe

Phoradendron tomentosum, the leafy mistletoe, hairy mistletoe or Christmas mistletoe, is a plant parasite. It is characterized by its larger leaves and smaller berries than dwarf mistletoe. Leafy mistletoe seldom kill but they do rob their hosts of moisture and some minerals, causing stress during drought and reducing crop productions on fruit and nut trees. Leafy mistletoe has the ability to photosynthesize on its own but it relies on other plants in order to obtain its nutrients. It attaches itself to a tree and then grows haustoria, in order to get the food and water it needs.

== Host and symptoms ==
Symptoms can include dieback, swelling, formations of witches’ broom and weakened branches. Leafy mistletoe can occur on several hundred host species. These include hardwood trees. Signs are green leafy green stems, and berries.

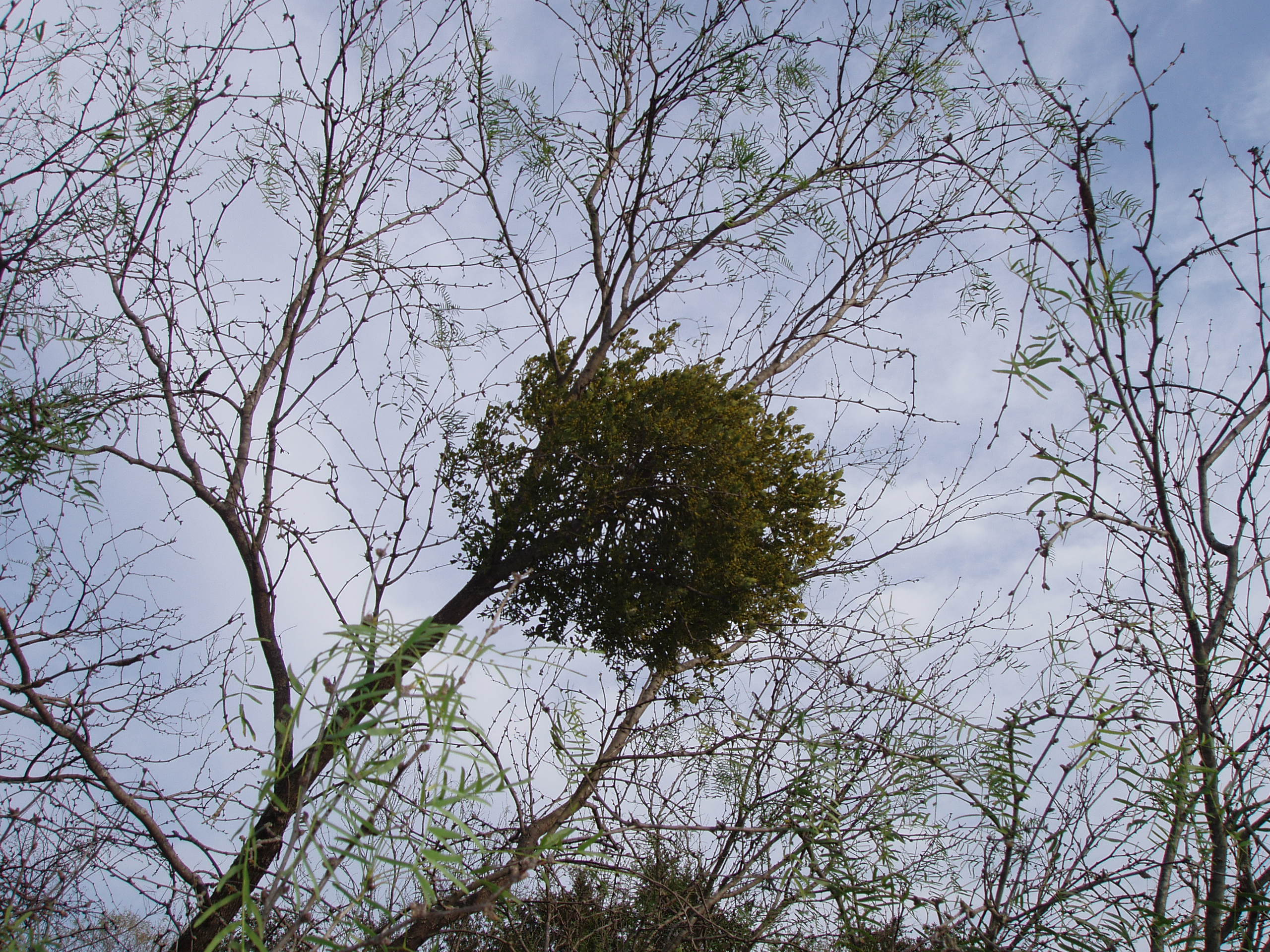
Honey mesquite (Prosopis glandulosa) with Phoradendron tomentosum in Hood County, Texas

== Disease cycle ==
Birds are the primary disease vector in the dispersal of the plant parasite leafy mistletoe. Birds consume the seeds from the fruit of P. tomentosum, also called drupes, and excrete or regurgitate the seeds onto the branches of which the birds perch. The most important birds for effective dispersal include cedar waxwings, euphonias, silky flycatcher, bluebirds, thrushes, robins, and solitaires. The seeds germinate within the tree for several years, eventually producing a haustorium, a root-like structure, that penetrates the host plant and extracts water and minerals from the infected tree or plant. Phoradendron is a hemiparasite, meaning that it produces its own chlorophyll, but relies on the host plant to provide essential elements for growth and survival. Stems, flowers, and fruits also grow from the seed following germination with fruits being produced several years after infection.

== Environment ==
Leafy mistletoe parasitizes a broad range of trees common in amenity and natural landscapes in the United States and the Americas, where winter temperatures are consistently warmer. As are all plants, Phoradendron is subject to death at extremely low temperatures.

== Management ==
Phoradendron tomentosum can adversely affect trees growing in urban environments as well as in forests. Although mistletoe is photosynthetic, it is an obligate, semi parasitic evergreen plant that infects host plants to derive support, water, and essential elements. They are considered a nuisance in urban environments because of their appearance in deciduous trees during winter. When colonization is extensive in individual trees, mistletoe can adversely affect tree health causing a decline and death.

Phoradendron tomentosum primarily infects broad-leaved tree species such as hackberry, mesquite oak, and elm in USDA zone 6 and warmer in the United States. It also commonly infects cherry, walnut, beech, and other tree species. Although some mistletoe species show host specialization, new sites, and new host species have been reported for broadleaf mistletoe. Improving control methods for mistletoe in urban forests is important as a result of the particular interactions of different tree species in varied environments.

Operations include regenerating with a non-host tree, thinning trees to improve vigor and tolerance of the infestation, and sanitation by removing infected trees or branches or removing aerial shoots. Pruning infected branches is often sufficient; where the loss of infected branches cannot be accepted, the aerial shoots can be just knocked off. Mistletoe can be removed from the tree by pruning out the mistletoe shoots at the branch surface. Although the mistletoe might quickly resprout, some benefit is derived by annual mistletoe removal because it reduces seed production and spread of mistletoe within and among trees. Removing the shoots does not eliminate the mistletoe infection but does reduce its reproduction and damage. Shoots will reappear after several years. Covering infected branches with tarpaper or creosote has not proven either attractive or effective. These treatments work by prohibiting photosynthesis of the haustorium by opaque coverings. Perhaps the best way for discouraging additional bird-dispersal of mistletoe seeds is with branch pruning or shoot removal (since it is often the mistletoe fruits that initially attract the birds). Given the modest damage and slow rate of increase of these mistletoes, these methods are usually sufficient.

After seeds germinate, they produce a haustorium or root-like structures that penetrate the host to extract water and minerals. This endophytic portion results in a challenging control problem because treatments must kill the outer ectophytic portion of the plant as well as the endophytic portion without damaging the host.

== Importance ==
Although the Phoradendron mistletoes that infect conifers are widely distributed in the Western United States and in Mexico on a number of common and valuable hosts, their importance is mostly on a local basis and for special uses. In the United States, Phoradendron are most important in California on incense cedar and true fir in certain areas and important broadly across the Southwest (California to Texas) on junipers.

Extensive infections and mortality are uncommon in ashes. However, infections occur typically in open-grown trees. This true mistletoe is used as greenery in Christmas decorations.

Many species of hardwood trees are affected by mistletoe, but oaks and hickories are most commonly attacked. The impact of infestation is not normally severe, but the parasite may lower individual branch vigor. Where infestations are severe, tree decline may progress to the point where insect and fungus pests combine to kill trees.

Injury caused by dwarf mistletoe is manifested in a variety of ways: reduction in tree growth, distortion of growth, reduction in wood quality, predisposition of trees to secondary attack, and reduction in seed yield.
