= Phoradendron capitellatum =

Scientific classification
- Kingdom: Plantae
- Clade: Tracheophytes
- Clade: Angiosperms
- Clade: Eudicots
- Order: Santalales
- Family: Santalaceae
- Genus: Phoradendron
- Species: P. capitellatum

Binomial name
- Phoradendron capitellatum Torr.

Species of flowering plant

Phoradendron capitellatum, the downy mistletoe or hairy mistletoe, is a hemiparasitic plant native to Arizona, New Mexico, Chihuahua and Sonora. It grows mostly on junipers (Juniperus spp) at elevations of 800–1,700 m (2,600–5,600 ft). It is distinguished by having short, densely puberulent leaves usually less than 3 cm long. Flowers are also pubescent. Berries are pink to white, about 3 mm in diam.
