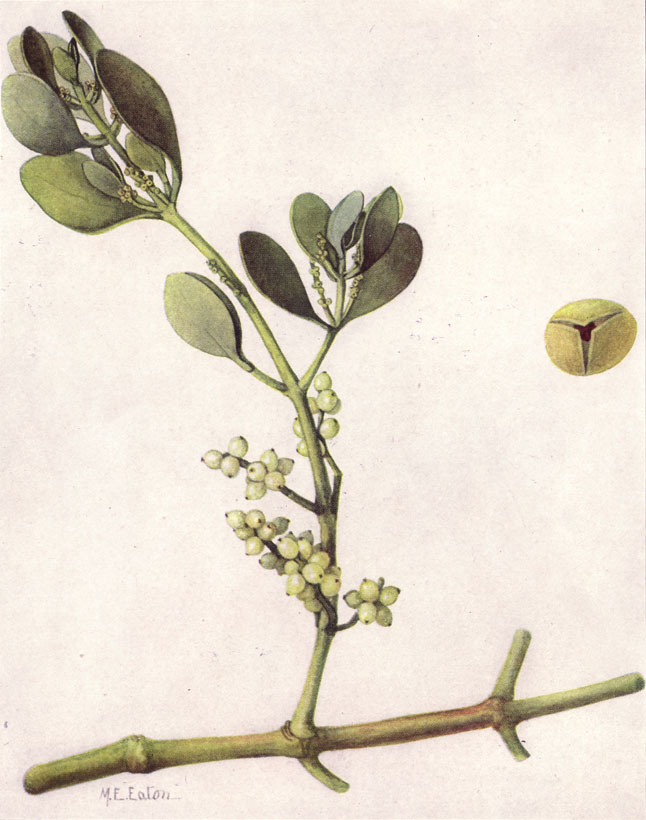
- Phoradendron leucarpum

Scientific classification
- Kingdom: Plantae
- Clade: Tracheophytes
- Clade: Angiosperms
- Clade: Eudicots
- Order: Santalales
- Family: Santalaceae
- Genus: Phoradendron
- Species: P. leucarpum

Binomial name
- Phoradendron leucarpum (Raf.) Reveal & M. C. Johnst.

Synonyms
- Phoradendron flavescens (Pursh) Nutt. ex A. Gray; Phoradendron serotinum (Raf.) M. C. Johnst.; Phoradendron tomentosum (DC.) A. Gray; Phoradendron villosum (Nutt.) Engelm.; Viscum leucarpum Raf. (basionym); Viscum serotinum Raf.; Viscum tomentosum DC.; Viscum villosum Nutt.

= Phoradendron leucarpum =

Species of flowering plant

Phoradendron leucarpum is a species of mistletoe in the Viscaceae family. Its common names include American mistletoe, eastern mistletoe, hairy mistletoe and oak mistletoe. It is native to Mexico and the continental United States. It is hemiparasitic, living in the branches of trees. It produces sugars through photosynthesis but also draws water and nutrients from host trees. The berries are white and 3–6 millimeters (0.12–0.24 in). It has opposite leaves that are leathery and thick. Ingesting the berries can cause "stomach and intestinal irritation with diarrhea, lowered blood pressure, and slow pulse". This shrub can grow to 1 meter (3.3 ft) by 1 meter (3.3 ft).

== Culture and tradition ==
Phoradendron leucarpum is used in North America as a surrogate for the similar European mistletoe Viscum album, in Christmas decoration and associated traditions (such as "kissing under the mistletoe"), as well as in rituals by modern druids. It is commercially harvested and sold for those purposes.

Phoradendron leucarpum is the floral emblem for the state of Oklahoma. The state had no official flower, leaving mistletoe as the assumed state flower until the Oklahoma Rose was so designated in 2004.

== Taxonomy ==
Phoradendron leucarpum was first described in 1817 as Viscum leucarpum, in the same genus as Viscum album (European mistletoe), but was later moved to Phoradendron, a genus found only in the Americas and separate from the European genus Viscum.

P. leucarpum can be distinguished from Viscum album (European mistletoe) by its broader, oval leaves and larger berry clusters.

== Ecology ==
=== Trees ===
Over 60 species of trees are hosts to P. leucarpum, especially trees in the genera of Acer (maple), Fraxinus (ash), Juglans (walnuts), Nyssa, Platanus (plane trees), Populus (poplars), Quercus (oaks), Salix (willows), and Ulmus (elms). For mistletoes in general, their effects on hosts depends mainly on how severe the infection is and on drought. Light infections are generally considered harmless, while severe infections can reduce growth and cause branch dieback, especially during drought when the mistletoe keeps drawing water from a stressed host.

=== Birds ===
Many birds eat mistletoe berries, which in turn helps the plant to disperse seeds. Eastern bluebird and Cedar waxwing are reported eaters of P. leucarpum, and many other birds like phainopepla, grouse, mourning doves, bluebirds, evening grosbeaks, robins, and pigeons harvest on a wide variety of mistletoe species. Because the white fruit of P. leucarpum contains adhesive pulp, birds can help transport its seeds to tree branches through their droppings. The fruit may also cling to birds’ beaks and feathers, allowing the seeds to reach new locations.

=== Butterflies, bees, and other animals ===
Many butterflies also depend on mistletoes for their survival. P. leucarpum, specifically, is a breeding site and an important food source for the great purple hairstreak. The adults will drink nectar from mistletoe flowers and will lay eggs on the mistletoe which will later feed their caterpillars. Two other butterfly species, the thicket hairstreak and the Johnson's hairstreak, also entirely depend on mistletoes but a different species called dwarf mistletoes. Mistletoes in general are also important nectar and pollen plant for bees, and in return, wind and insects are important mistletoe pollinators. While mistletoe is toxic to people, the berries and leaves of mistletoe provide high-protein nutrients for many mammals such as elk, cattle and deer, especially in autumn and winter when other foods are scarce.

== See also ==
- Mistletoe
- Phoradendron villosum (Pacific mistletoe, western mistletoe)
- Viscum album (European mistletoe)
