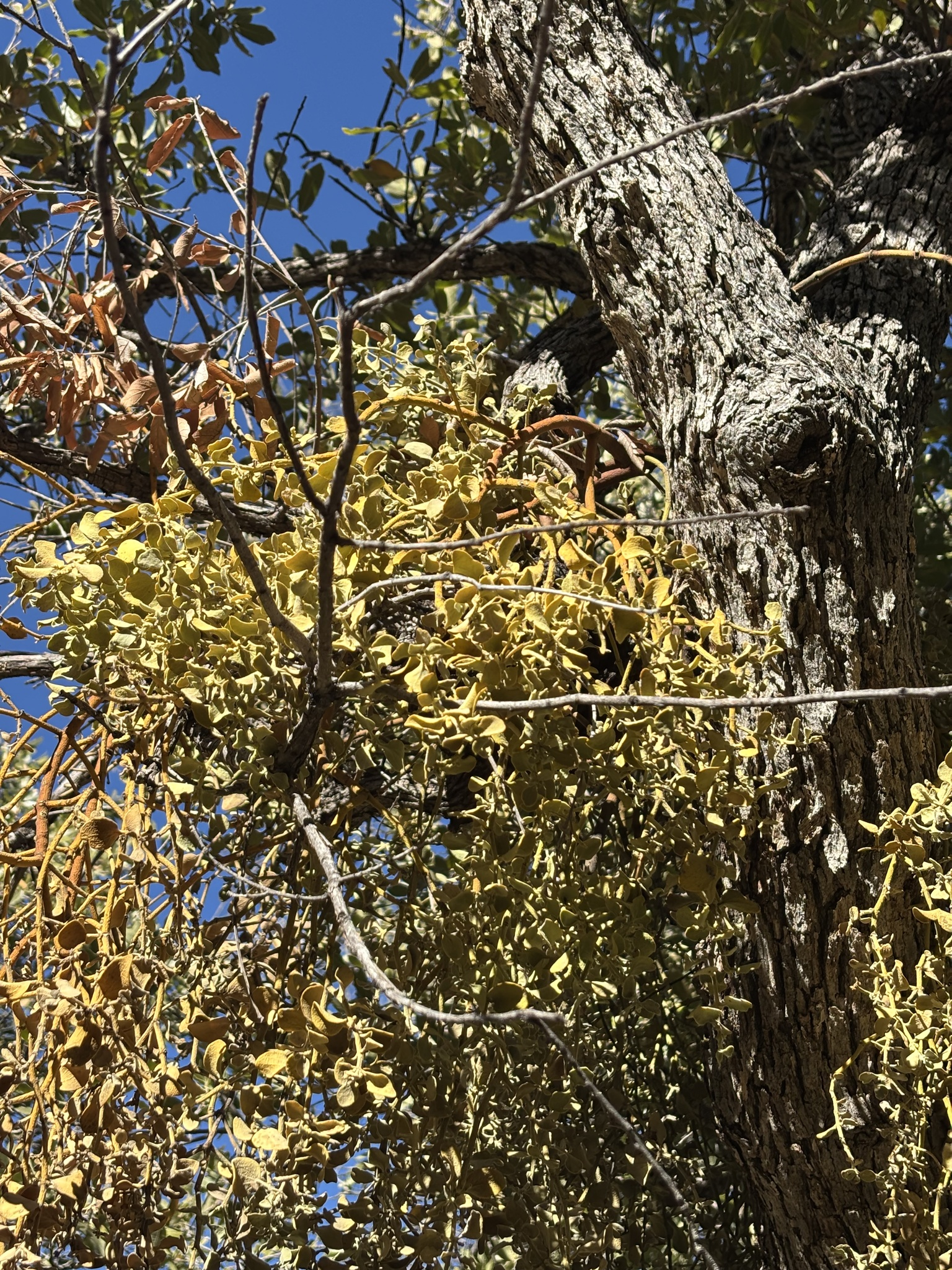

Scientific classification
- Kingdom: Plantae
- Clade: Tracheophytes
- Clade: Angiosperms
- Clade: Eudicots
- Order: Santalales
- Family: Santalaceae
- Genus: Phoradendron
- Species: P. coryae

Binomial name
- Phoradendron coryae Trel.

= Phoradendron coryae =

Species of flowering plant

Phoradendron coryae, Cory's mistletoe or oak mistletoe, is a hemiparasitic plant native to the southwestern United States and northern Mexico. It is reported from Arizona, New Mexico, Texas, Chihuahua, Coahuila and Sonora.

The species generally grows on oaks (Quercus spp.) but has also been found on Condalia, Berberis, Vaquelinia and Sideroxylon. It has larger leaves than many other mistletoes of the region, up to 3 cm long. Leaves and flowers are pubescent. Berries are white, with short hairs around the persistent perianth.
