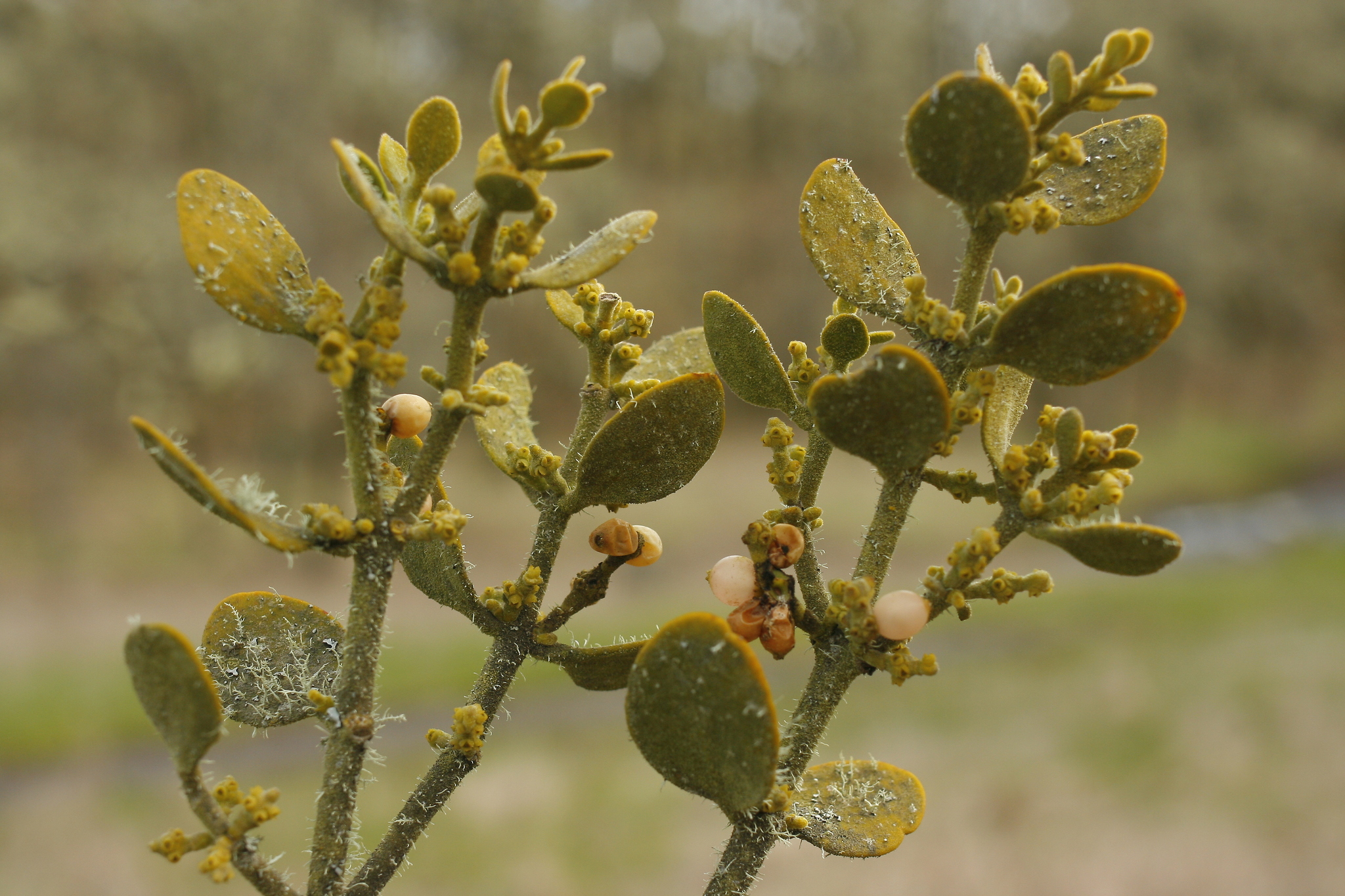

Scientific classification
- Kingdom: Plantae
- Clade: Tracheophytes
- Clade: Angiosperms
- Clade: Eudicots
- Order: Santalales
- Family: Santalaceae
- Genus: Phoradendron
- Species: P. villosum

Binomial name
- Phoradendron villosum Nutt.

= Phoradendron villosum =

Species of mistletoe

Phoradendron villosum is a species of flowering plant in the sandalwood family known by the common names Pacific mistletoe and oak mistletoe. It is native to western North America from Oregon south into Mexico, where it grows in oak woodland and similar habitat.

This mistletoe is a parasitic plant on host trees, especially oak species, and other trees and woody shrubs such as manzanitas, California bay laurel, and sumac.

It is a shrub producing many erect gray-green or yellow-green branches which may reach a meter long. Its stems are lined with pairs of hairy, oval, oppositely arranged leaves up to about 5 centimeters long by 2.5 wide. As a hemiparasite the mistletoe taps its host tree for water and nutrients but contains some chlorophyll and can photosynthesize some energy for itself as well. The plant is dioecious, with male and female individuals producing different forms of inflorescence; both are rough, elongated clusters of tiny flowers. Female flowers yield pale pink spherical or oval berries each 3 or 4 millimeters wide.
