= L. purpureum =

L. purpureum may refer to:

- Lamium purpureum, the red deadnettle, purple deadnettle or purple archangel, a herbaceous flowering plant species native to Europe and Asia
- Lasiopetalum purpureum, a synonym for Thomasia purpurea, a shrub species found in Australia

== See also ==
- Purpureum (disambiguation)
