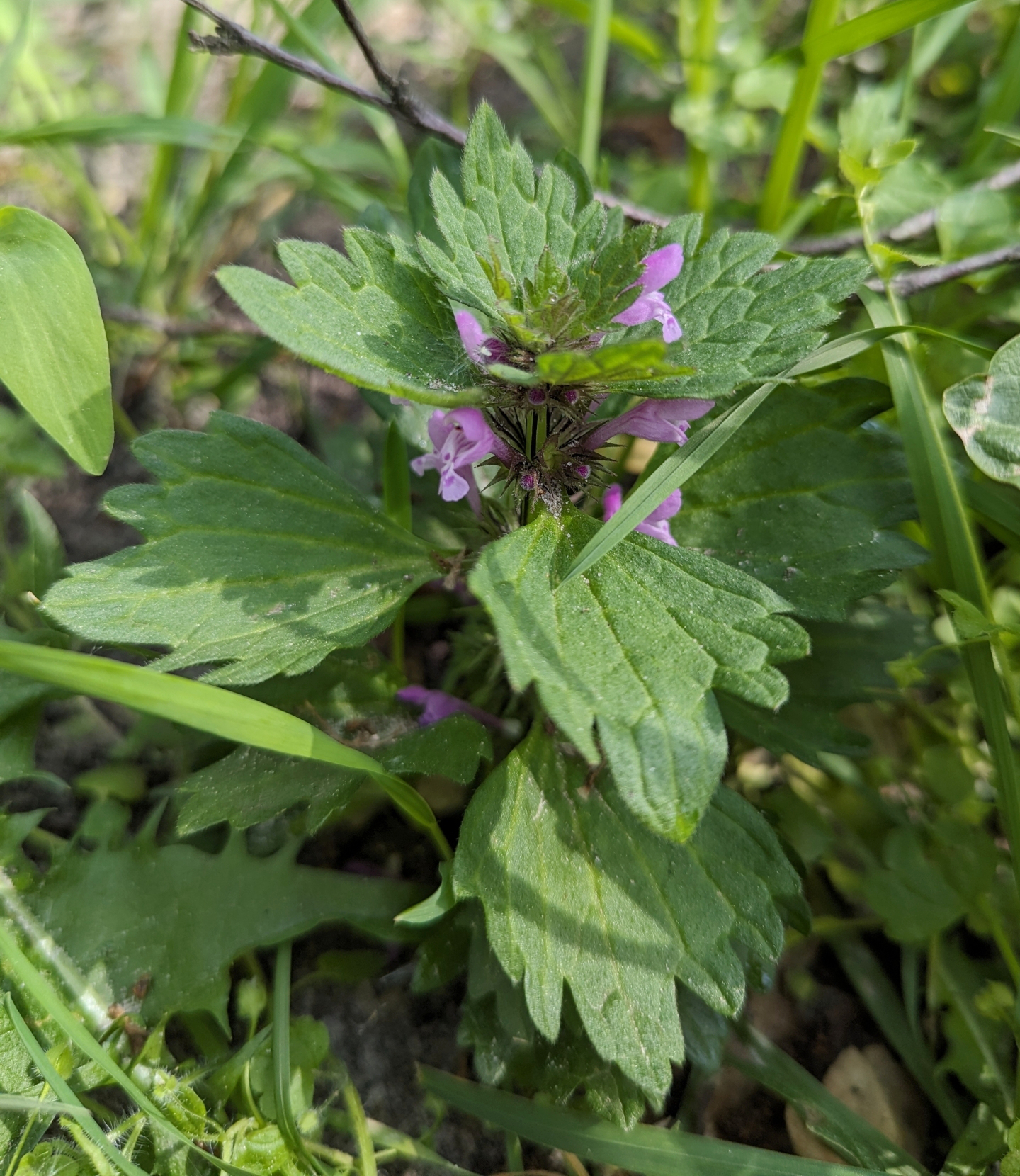
- Cut-leaved dead-nettle in Oldenburg, Germany

Scientific classification
- Kingdom: Plantae
- Clade: Tracheophytes
- Clade: Angiosperms
- Clade: Eudicots
- Clade: Asterids
- Order: Lamiales
- Family: Lamiaceae
- Genus: Lamium
- Species: L. hybridum

Binomial name
- Lamium hybridum Vill.

Synonyms
- L. purpureum var. hybridum (Vill.) Vill.

= Lamium hybridum =

Species of flowering plant

Lamium hybridum, the cut-leaved dead-nettle, is a species of Lamium native to western and northern Europe and northwestern Africa. The specific name means 'hybrid'; however, Dominique Villars, in describing the species, did not give his reasons for selecting this name. The English name refers to the deeply cut leaves, unlike the shallower lobes of other related species of Lamium.

== Taxonomy ==
Dominique Villars first described it as a species in 1786 in volume 1, p. 251, of his Histoire des Plantes de Dauphiné, but a year later in volume 2, p. 385, he had second thoughts about it, and reduced it to a variety of the similar red dead-nettle Lamium purpureum. It was for long so treated, but recently, genetic evidence has shown it is genetically distinct from L. purpureum and should stand as a distinct species. This has been accepted by Plants of the World Online. More interesting is the suggestion that it may indeed be of hybrid origin between Lamium purpureum and Lamium bifidum, so Villars had unexpected insight in his name choice.

== Description ==
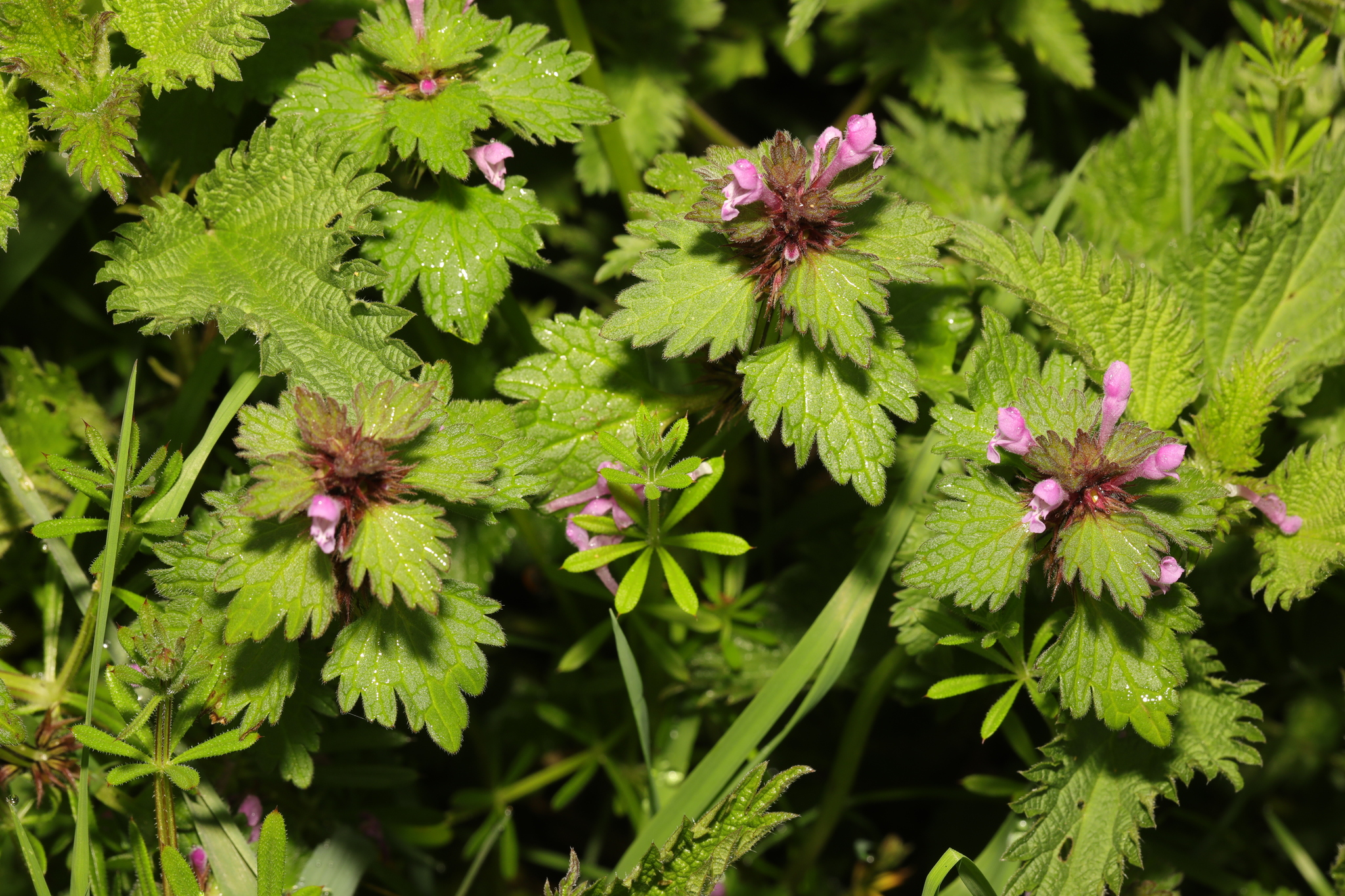
Cut-leaved dead-nettle in Liverpool; note the deeply incised leaves.

It is a low-growing annual plant growing to 10–40 cm (3.9–15.7 in) tall, pubescent with soft, finely hairy stems. The leaves are opposite, rounded to kidney-shaped, 2–3 cm (0.79–1.18 in) diameter, with a deeply lobed to incised margin. The flowers are a similar pink to purple colour to L. purpureum, relatively small, 10–15 mm (0.39–0.59 in) long, and form a few-flowered terminal spike with axillary whorls. The calyx is regular with five lobes and closes up after flowering. The corolla is purplish-red, fused into a short tube; the upper lip is convex, and the lower lip has three lobes, two small side ones and a larger central long one. The base of the corolla is nearly hairless, unlike L. purpureum where it is obviously ringed with hairs. There are four stamens, two long and two short. It flowers from early spring through the summer until mid autumn, typically March to October in Britain. The gynoecium has two fused carpels and the fruit is a four-chambered schizocarp. It propagates by seed. It is a nectar and pollen source for bees.

== Distribution and habitat ==
Cut-leaf dead-nettle is native to western and northern Europe, and northwest Africa in the Atlas Mountains. Its status in Great Britain and Ireland is disputed; some sources give it as native, while others cite it as an archaeophyte. It is found growing in open areas, gardens, fields and meadows, and widely in uncultivated areas in urban habitats.
