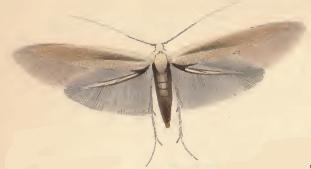

Scientific classification
- Kingdom: Animalia
- Phylum: Arthropoda
- Clade: Pancrustacea
- Class: Insecta
- Order: Lepidoptera
- Family: Coleophoridae
- Genus: Coleophora
- Species: C. ochripennella

Binomial name
- Coleophora ochripennella Zeller, 1849

= Coleophora ochripennella =

Species of moth

Coleophora ochripennella is a species of moth from the family Coleophoridae. It is found from Germany and Poland to the Pyrenees, Italy and Greece.

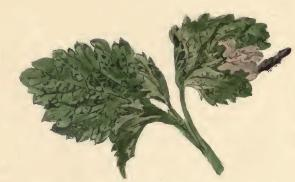
Sprig of Ballota nigra with a larva-case attached

Larva

The larvae feed on Ballota nigra, Glechoma hederacea, Lamium album, Lamium purpureum, Stachys officinalis and Stachys sylvatica. Larvae can be found from October to May.
