= C. purpureum =

C. purpureum may refer to:

- Chlorogalum purpureum, the purple amole, a flowering plant species endemic to California
- Chondrostereum purpureum, the silver leaf, a fungus plant pathogen species

== See also ==
- Purpureum (disambiguation)
