= D. purpurea =

D. purpurea may refer to:

- Dalea purpurea, the purple prairie clover, a flowering plant species native to central North America
- Digitalis purpurea, the common foxglove, purple foxglove or lady's glove, a flowering plant species native to most of Europe

== See also ==
- Purpurea (disambiguation)
