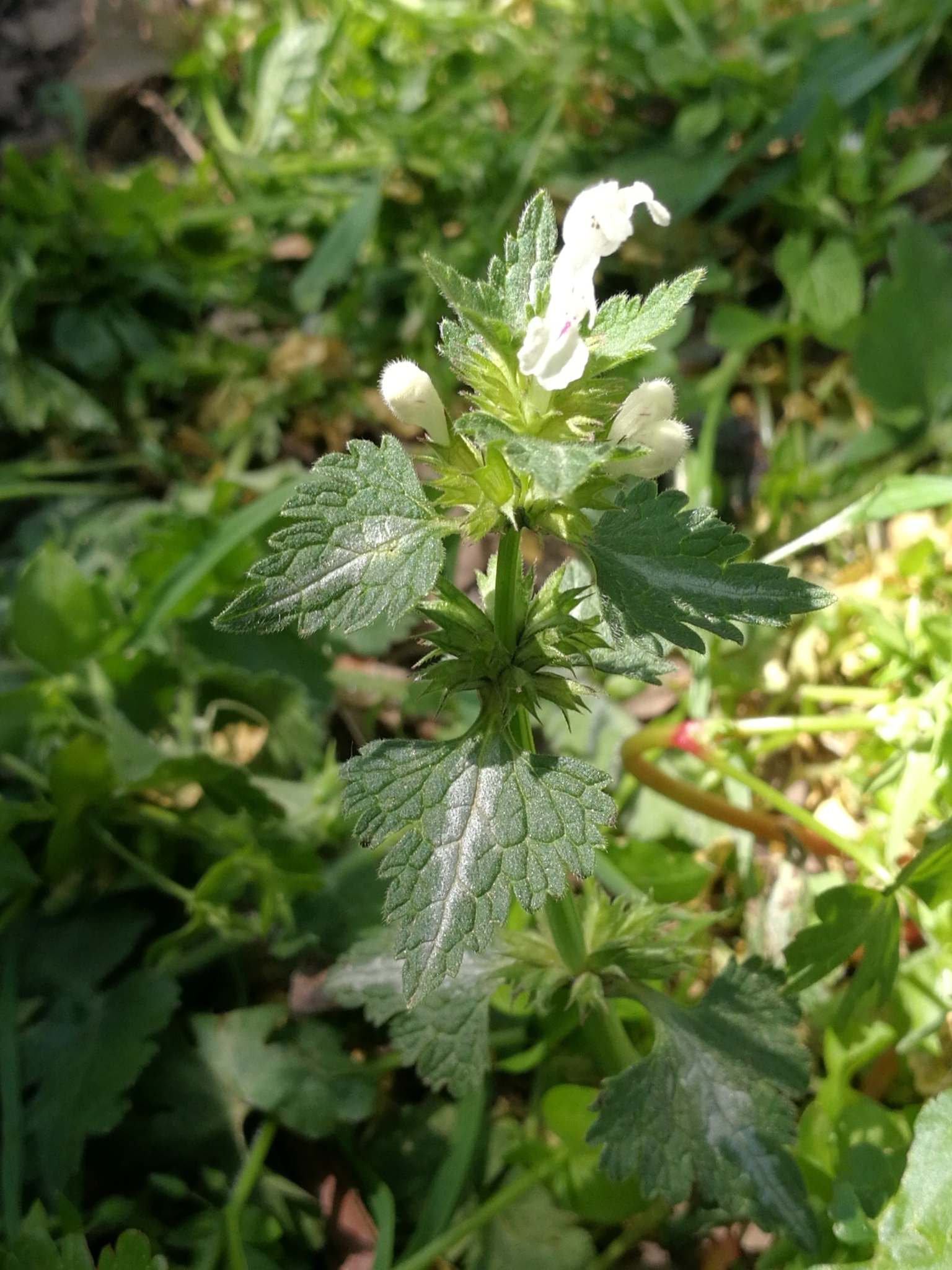

Scientific classification
- Kingdom: Plantae
- Clade: Embryophytes
- Clade: Tracheophytes
- Clade: Angiosperms
- Clade: Eudicots
- Clade: Asterids
- Order: Lamiales
- Family: Lamiaceae
- Genus: Lamium
- Species: L. bifidum

Binomial name
- Lamium bifidum Cirillo

Synonyms
- Lamium cryptanthum Guss.; Lamium gevorense Gómez Hern. & A. Pujadas; Lamium panormitanum Lojac.

= Lamium bifidum =

Species of flowering plant

Lamium bifidum is a species of flowering plant in the mint family Lamiaceae, native to the Southern Europe. It was first described by botanist Domenico Cirillo in 1788.

== Description ==
Lamium bifidum is an annual herbaceous plant. It possesses an erect or decumbent stem, white flowers and a deeply bifid lower lip. Flowers form in verticillasters of 20 or more flowers. These flowers are sometimes cleistogamous.

An analysis of the essential oil of Lamium bifidum bracts and leaves identified the highest constituents as germacrene D (34.9%), β-caryophyllene (11.5%) and α-Humulene (6.8%). This contrasted with the primary constituents identified in the flowers: myrcene (47.2%), β-caryophyllene (11.8%) and sabinene (11.0%).

The species possesses a chromosome count of 2n = 18.

== Taxonomy ==
Domenic Cirillo first described Lamium bifidum in his Plantarum Rariorum Regni Neapolitani, published in 1788. John Isaac Briquet's 1897 taxonomy placed the species within the subsection Amplexicaulia, within the larger section Pollichia. Jacob Mennema's 1989 revision of the genus narrowed its close relations, placing it instead within the Subgenus Lamium, in a smaller Section Lamium on the basis of morphological similarities, namely a straight corolla tube and presence of bracteoles. This section consists of L. bifidum as well as Lamium purpureum and Lamium confertum. 21st century phylogenetic studies brought this change into question however, finding a closer genetic relationship between L. bifidum and Lamium amplexicaule var. amplexicaule and Lamium incisum. A 2016 study of pollen structuring provided further evidence for this closer relation to the species of section Amplexicaule rather than section Lamium.

Authors have identified as many as four subspecies:

- subsp. bifidum
- subsp. albimontanum Rech. f. - endemic to Crete
- subsp. balcanicum Velen. endemic to the Balkan Peninsula & Romania, specifically the west Moesian-south Dacian area
- subsp. gevorense Gómez Hern. - endemic to Spain - identified in 1977, but proposed in 2005 to be raised as a separate species, Lamium gevorense

The albimontanum and balcanicum subspecies are distinguished from the type species by their pink or purple flowers.

Lamium bifidum var. clandestinum was previously raised to the separate species of Lamium cryptanthum, but this is now merely regarded as a synonym.

== Distribution ==
Lamium bifidum has been described as having a broadly Mediterranean distribution. One or more subspecies have been documented as present in parts of Bulgaria, Corsica, Crete, Greece, Italy, Portugal, Romania, Sardinia, Spain, Tunisia and the former Yugoslavia.

The species inhabits open spaces and clearings, waste places, mountain slopes and forest edges.

== Uses ==
A chemical constituent of Lamium bifidum, hesperetin, has identified anti-estrogen, tumorigenesis and breast cancer cell inhibition properties.
