= Wiedemannia =

Wiedemannia is the scientific name of two genera of organisms and may refer to:

- Wiedemannia (fly), a genus of insects in the family Empididae
- Wiedemannia (plant), a genus of plants in the family Lamiaceae
