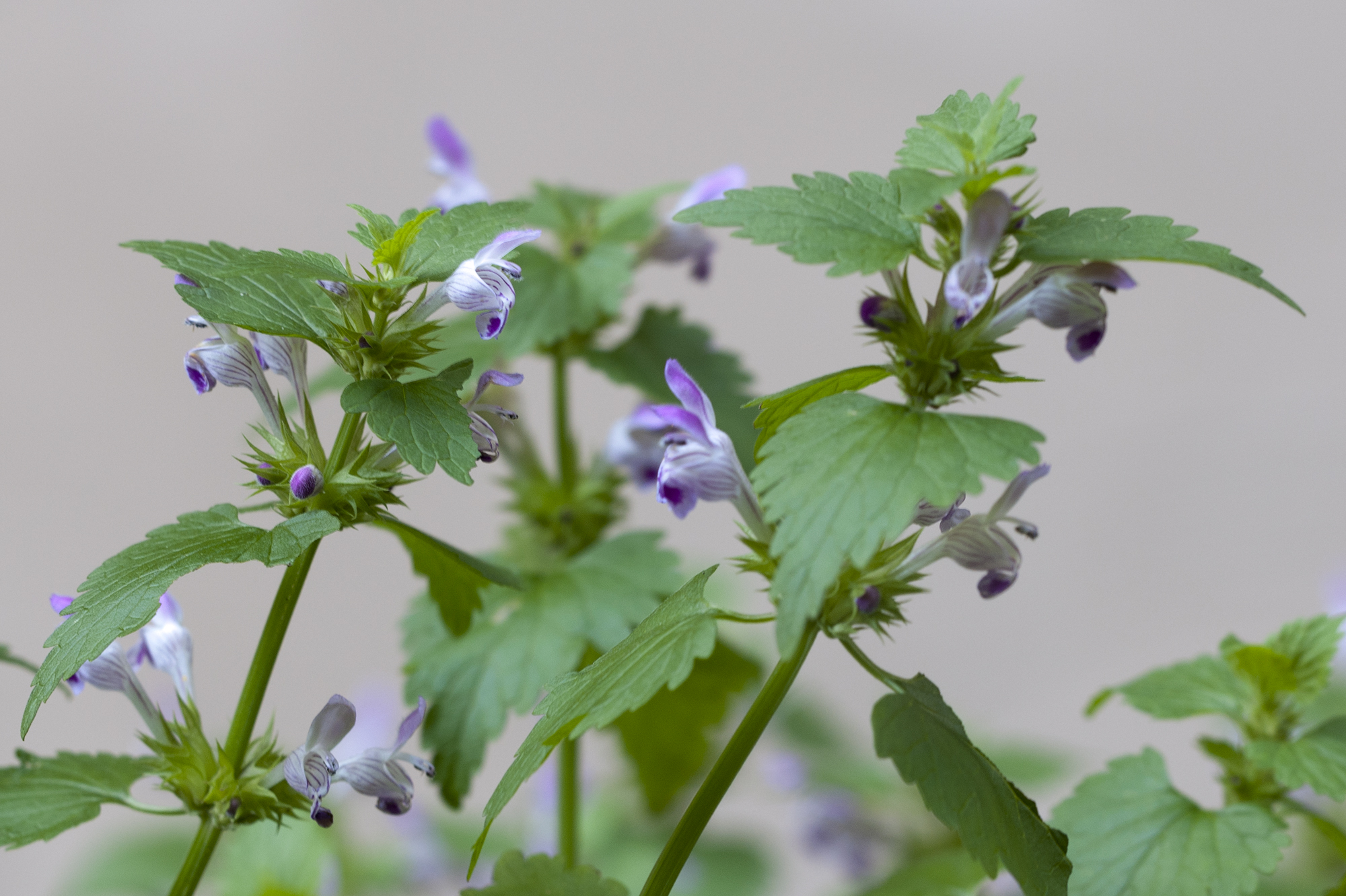
- In Kapıkaya Canyon, Turkey

Scientific classification
- Kingdom: Plantae
- Clade: Tracheophytes
- Clade: Angiosperms
- Clade: Eudicots
- Clade: Asterids
- Order: Lamiales
- Family: Lamiaceae
- Genus: Lamium
- Species: L. garganicum

Binomial name
- Lamium garganicum L.

= Lamium garganicum =

Monte Gargano Deadnettle

Species of flowering plant

Lamium garganicum, known as the monte gargano deadnettle, is a species of flowering plant in the family Lamiaceae.

== Distribution ==
The monte gargano deadnettle is native to Europe, being mostly found in France. It can also be found in the Balkans, the Middle East, Cyprus, Sardinia, Corsica, the Balearic Islands, and even Denmark.

== Taxonomy ==
Lamium garganicum was described and named by Carl Linnaeus in 1763.
