= Lamium multifidum =

Scientific classification
- Kingdom: Plantae
- Clade: Tracheophytes
- Clade: Angiosperms
- Clade: Eudicots
- Clade: Asterids
- Order: Lamiales
- Family: Lamiaceae
- Genus: Lamium
- Species: L. multifidum

Binomial name
- Lamium multifidum L.

Species of flowering plant

Lamium multifidum, the arabian deadnettle, is a species of flowering plant in the family Lamiaceae. This species is native to the Middle East, being found in Türkiye and Syria.

== Taxonomy ==
Lamium multifidum was described and named by Carl Linnaeus in 1753.
