= Purpureum =

Purpureum, purple in Latin, may refer to:

- Chlorogalum purpureum, the purple amole, a flowering plant species endemic to California
- Chondrostereum purpureum, the silver leaf, a fungus plant pathogen species
- Eutrochium purpureum, a herbaceous perennial plant in the sunflower family native to eastern and central North America
- Lamium purpureum, the red deadnettle, purple deadnettle or purple archangel, a herbaceous flowering plant species native to Europe and Asia
- Lasiopetalum purpureum, a synonym for Thomasia purpurea, a shrub species found in Australia
- Pennisetum purpureum, a species of perennial tropical grass native to the African grasslands
- Syzygium purpureum, a species of plant in the family Myrtaceae endemic to Fiji

== See also ==
- Purpurea (disambiguation)
- Purpura (disambiguation)
