= Lamium coutinhoi =

Conservation status
- Near Threatened (IUCN 3.1)

Scientific classification
- Kingdom: Plantae
- Clade: Tracheophytes
- Clade: Angiosperms
- Clade: Eudicots
- Clade: Asterids
- Order: Lamiales
- Family: Lamiaceae
- Genus: Lamium
- Species: L. coutinhoi

Binomial name
- Lamium coutinhoi J.G.Garcia

Species of flowering plant

Lamium coutinhoi is a species of flowering plant in the mint family Lamiaceae, endemic to central and northern Portugal. It inhabits path margins, roadsides and damp slopes, pastures and edges of cultivated fields, in granitic substrates.
