= Purpura (disambiguation) =

Purpura, purple in Latin, may refer to:

- Purpura, red or purple discolorations on the skin which do not blanch under pressure
- Purpura (gastropod), a genus of sea snails which can be used to produce a purple dye
- Purpura, an Anglo-Saxon textile term which may describe shot silk

== People ==
- Anthony Purpura (born 1986), American rugby union player
- Lia Purpura, American poet, writer and educator
- Michael Purpura, American attorney
- Tim Purpura, General Manager of the Houston Astros Major League Baseball team

== See also ==
- Purpurea (disambiguation)
- Purpureum (disambiguation)
