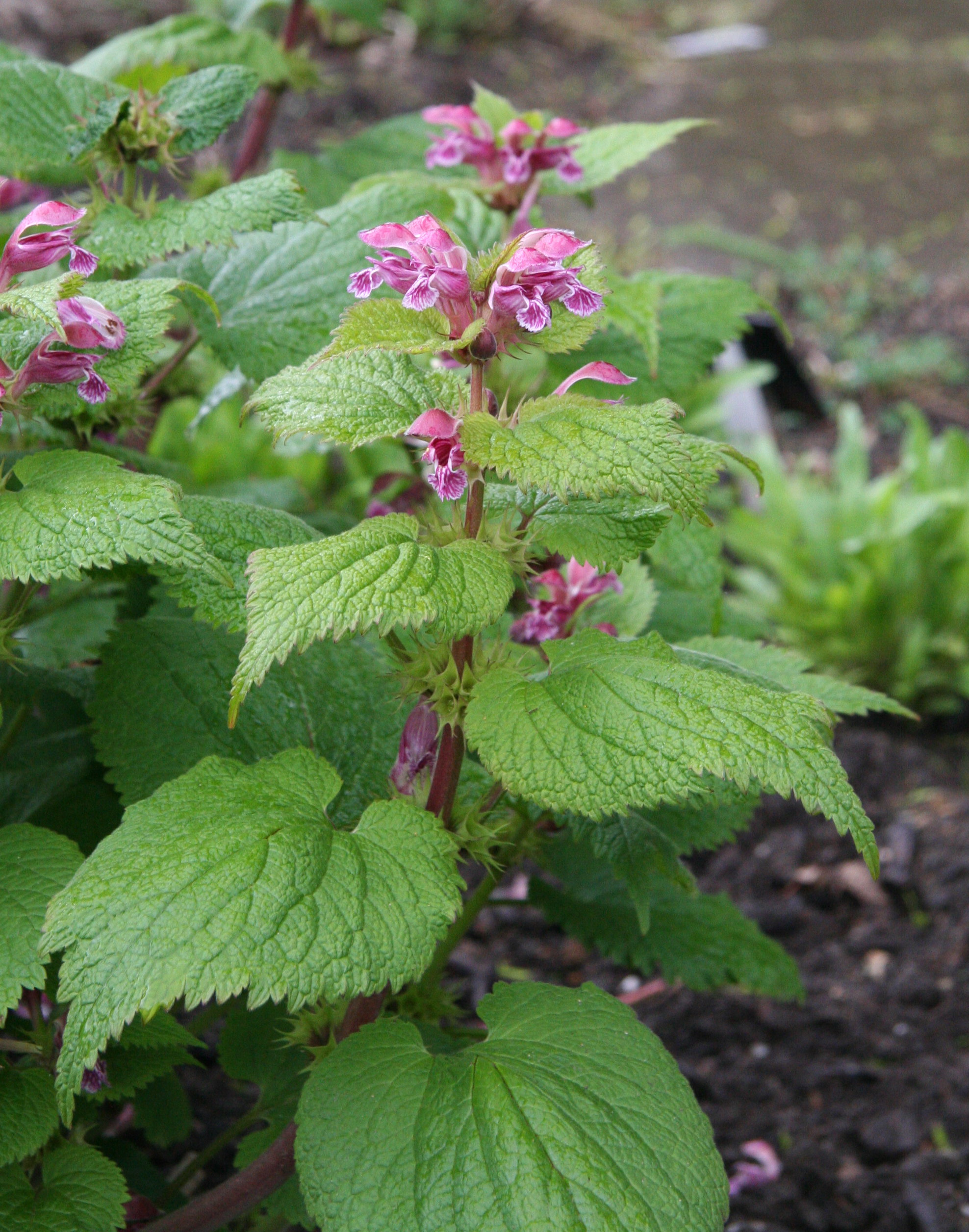

Scientific classification
- Kingdom: Plantae
- Clade: Tracheophytes
- Clade: Angiosperms
- Clade: Eudicots
- Clade: Asterids
- Order: Lamiales
- Family: Lamiaceae
- Genus: Lamium
- Species: L. orvala

Binomial name
- Lamium orvala L.

= Lamium orvala =

Balm-leaved Archangel

Species of flowering plant in the mint family

Lamium orvala, the balm-leaved archangel, is a species of flowering plant in the family Lamiaceae. It is native to Europe.

== Taxonomy ==
Lamium orvala was described and named by Carl Linnaeus in 1759.

== Distribution ==
Lamium orvala is native to south central Europe, ranging from northeastern Italy to southwestern Hungary. There is a disjunct population on Monte Gargano in southeastern Italy. The species has been introduced into Czechoslovakia.
