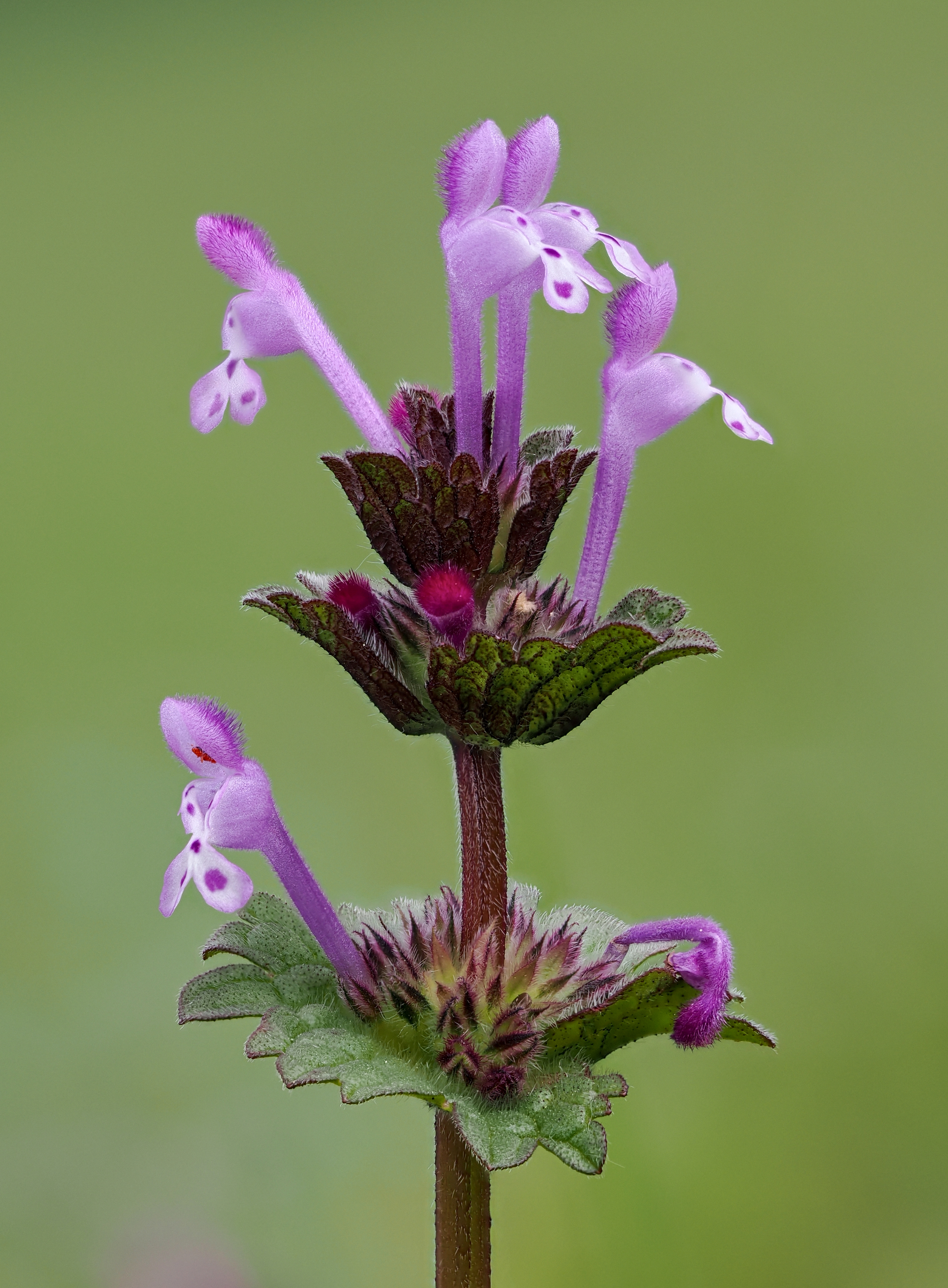
- Henbit dead-nettle in Belgium

Scientific classification
- Kingdom: Plantae
- Clade: Embryophytes
- Clade: Tracheophytes
- Clade: Spermatophytes
- Clade: Angiosperms
- Clade: Eudicots
- Clade: Asterids
- Order: Lamiales
- Family: Lamiaceae
- Genus: Lamium
- Species: L. amplexicaule

Binomial name
- Lamium amplexicaule L.

Subspecies and varieties
- L. amplexicaule var. aleppicum (Boiss. & Hausskn.) Bornm.; L. amplexicaule subsp. amplexicaule; L. amplexicaule var. bornmuelleri Mennema; L. amplexicaule var. incisum Boiss.; L. amplexicaule subsp. mauritanicum (Gand. ex Batt.) Maire; L. amplexicaule var. orientale (Pacz.) Mennema

Synonyms
- List: Neckeria amplexicaulis (L.) Forsyth f.; Galeobdolon amplexicaule (L.) Moench; Lamiella amplexicaulis (L.) Fourr.; Lamiopsis amplexicaulis (L.) Opiz; Pollichia amplexicaulis (L.) Willd.

= Lamium amplexicaule =

Plant species in the mint family

Lamium amplexicaule, commonly known as henbit dead-nettle, is a species of Lamium native to most of Europe, Asia and northern Africa. The specific name refers to the leaves, which are amplexicaul (clasping the stem).

== Description ==
It is a low-growing annual plant growing to 10–25 cm (4–10 in) (rarely to 40 cm) tall, thinly pubescent with soft, finely hairy stems. The leaves are opposite, rounded to kidney-shaped, 2–3 cm (3/4–1 1/4 in) diameter, with a lobed margin, and often with long internodes. The lower leaves are stalked and the upper ones stalkless, often fused, and clasping the stems. The flowers are pink to purple, relatively large, 1.5–2 cm (1/2–3/4 in) long, and form a few-flowered terminal spike with axillary whorls. The calyx is regular with five lobes and closes up after flowering. The corolla is purplish-red, fused into a usually erect tube 15 to 20 mm (1/2 to 3/4 in) long. The upper lip is convex, 3 to 5 mm (1/8 to 3/16 in) long and the lower lip has three lobes, two small side ones and a larger central one 1.5 to 2.5 mm (1/16 to 1/8 in) long. There are four stamens, two long and two short. The gynoecium has two fused carpels and the fruit is a four-chambered schizocarp.

This plant flowers very early in the spring even in northern areas, and for most of the winter and early spring in warmer locations such as the Mediterranean region. At times of year when there are not many pollinating insects, the flowers self-pollinate.

It is often found alongside Lamium purpureum (red dead-nettle), for which it is easily mistaken, because the two species bear not only similar leaves, but also similar bright pink to purple flowers. They can, however, be distinguished from one another by the form of the leaves on their respective flowering stems; those of red dead-nettle are petiolate, while those of henbit dead-nettle are sessile.

== Taxonomy ==
Lamium amplexicaule was described and named by Carl Linnaeus in 1753.

== Distribution and habitat ==
Henbit dead-nettle is native to most of Europe, Asia and North Africa, and has since been spread around the world by human activity. It is found growing in open areas, gardens, fields and meadows, and widely in uncultivated areas in urban habitats. It propagates freely by seed, where it becomes a key part of a meadow ecosystem; sometimes entire fields will be reddish-purple with its flowers before spring ploughing.

It is widely naturalised in eastern North and South America, New Zealand, South Africa and Tasmania. Its attractive appearance, edibility, and readiness to grow in many climates often mean it is permitted to grow when other weeds are not.

Its status in Great Britain and Ireland is disputed; some sources give it as native, while others cite it as an archaeophyte.

== Ecology ==
The seed is eaten by many species of birds. Where common, it is an important nectar and pollen plant for bees, especially honeybees. It also provides forage for animals.

It is often considered a weed, and even invasive in some states.

== Uses ==
The young leaves and shoots can be eaten raw or cooked, as can the stems and flowers. Henbit dead-nettle has a slightly sweet and peppery flavour, similar to celery.

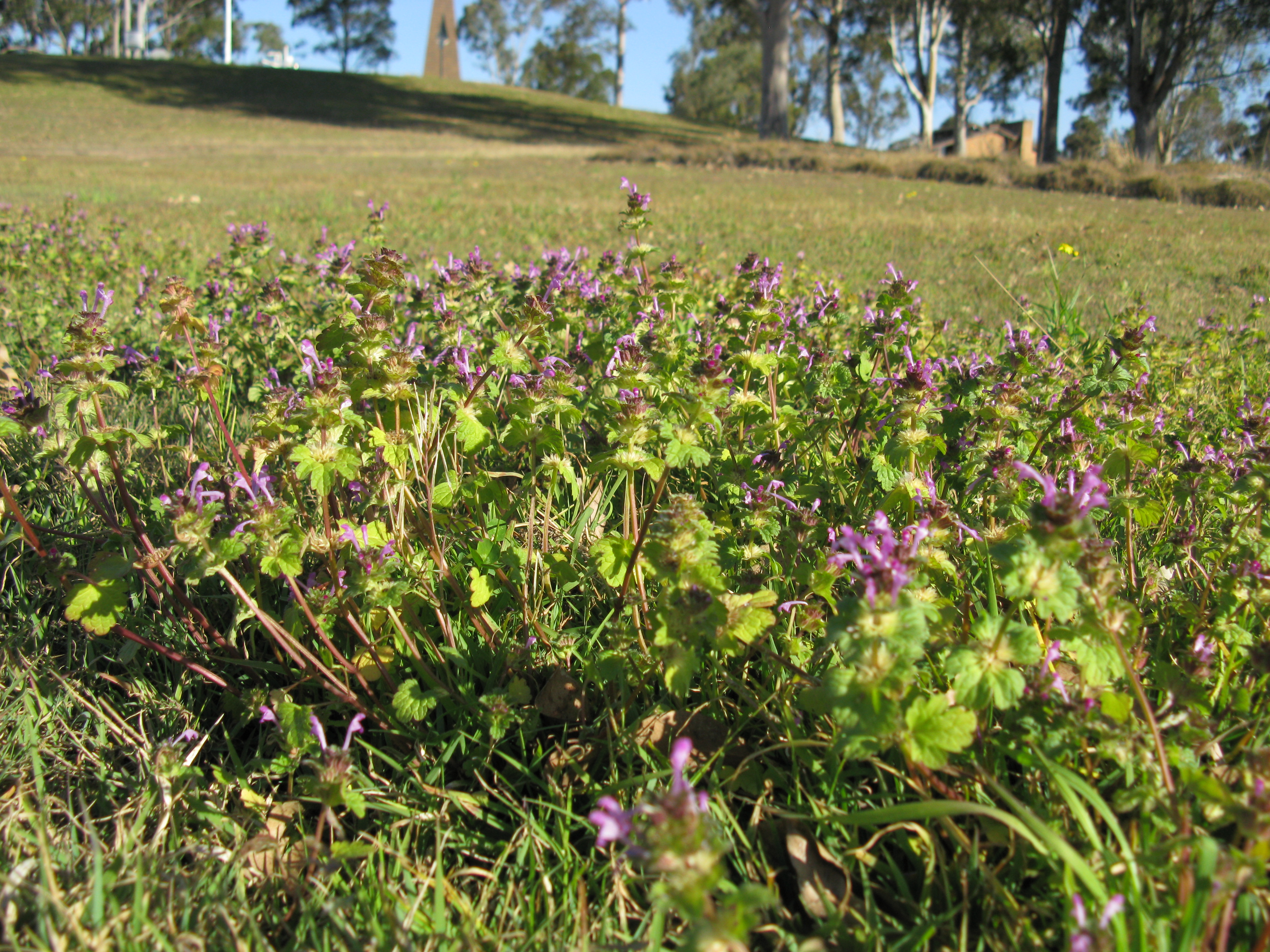
As an invasive species in Australia

Botanical scan

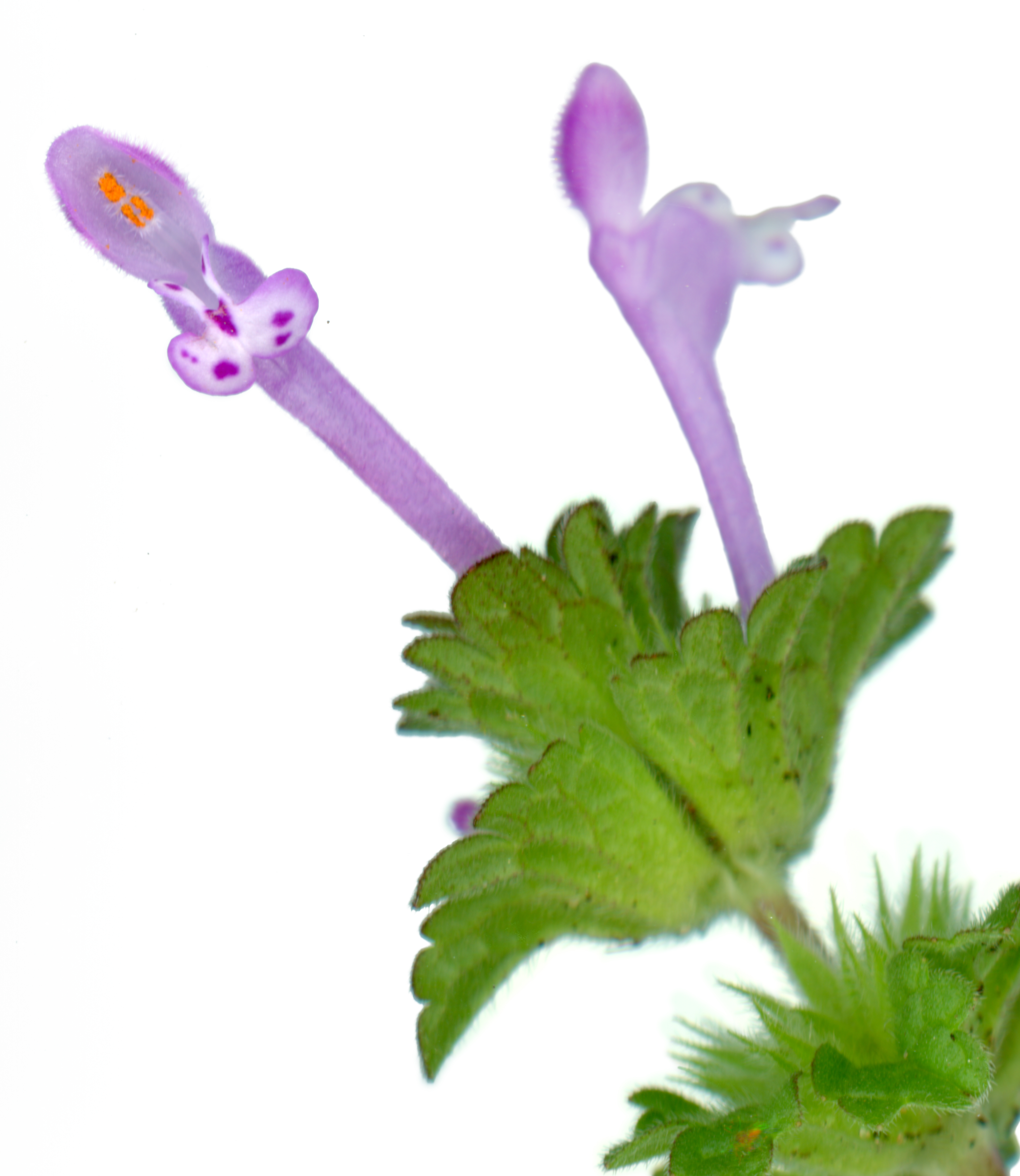
Close-up of flower
