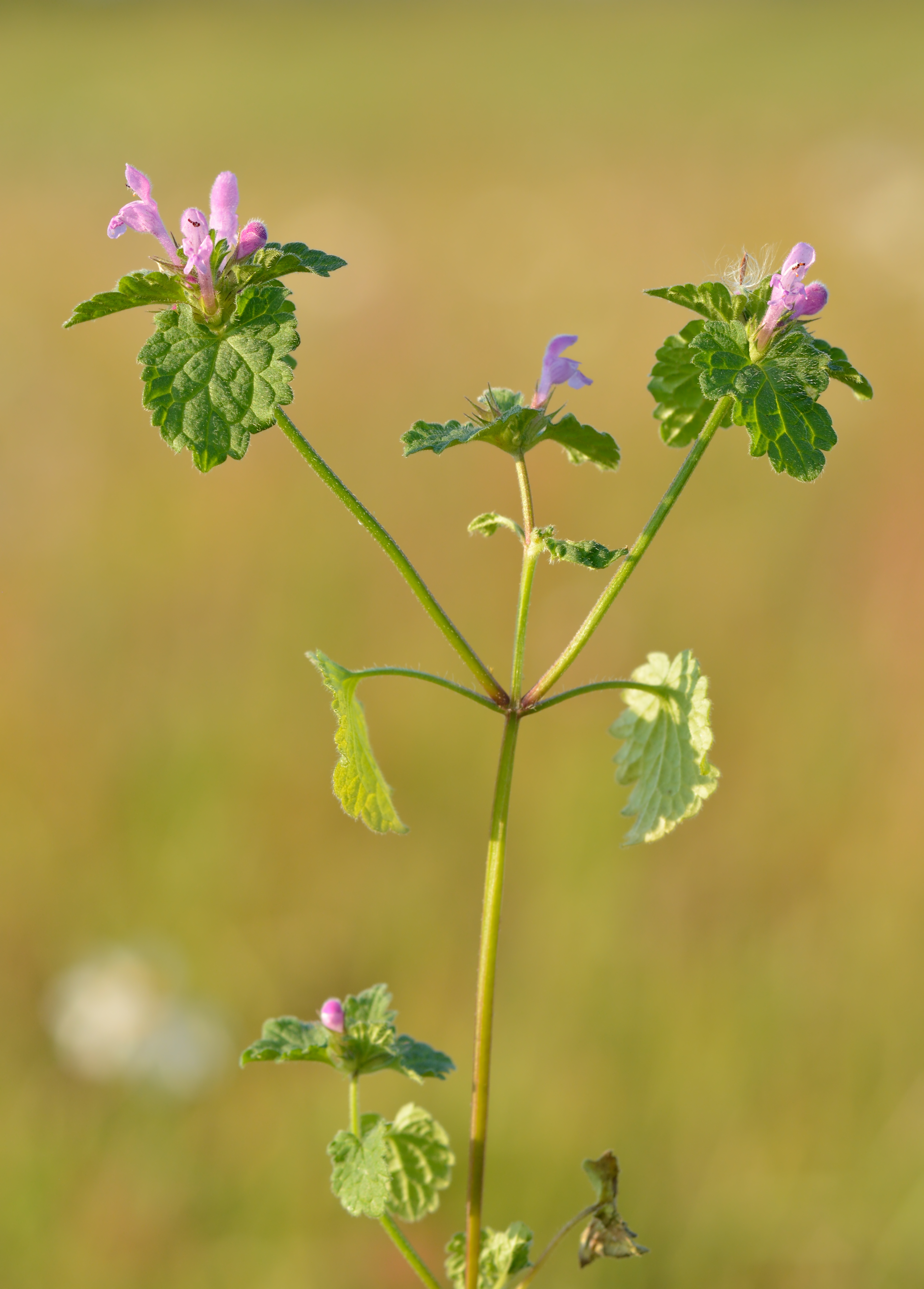
- Lamium amplexicaule

Scientific classification
- Kingdom: Plantae
- Clade: Embryophytes
- Clade: Tracheophytes
- Clade: Angiosperms
- Clade: Eudicots
- Clade: Asterids
- Order: Lamiales
- Family: Lamiaceae
- Subfamily: Lamioideae
- Genus: Lamium; L.

Type species
- Lamium purpureum L.

Synonyms
- Galeobdolon Adans.; Lamiastrum Heist. ex Fabr.; Lamiella Fourr.; Lamiopsis Opiz; Orvala L.; Pollichia Schrank.; Psilopsis Neck.; Wiedemannia Fisch. & C.A.Mey.

= Lamium =

Genus of flowering plants

Lamium (dead-nettles) is a genus of about 30 species of flowering plants in the family Lamiaceae, of which it is the type genus. They are all herbaceous plants native to Eurasia and northern Africa, with several widely naturalised across much of the temperate world.

== Description ==
The genus includes both annual and perennial species; they spread by both seeds and stems rooting as they grow along the ground. They have square stems and coarsely textured pairs of leaves, often with striking patterns or variegation. They produce double-lipped flowers in a wide range of colours.

== Taxonomy ==
In volume 2 of Species Plantarum published in 1753, the Swedish botanist Carl Linnaeus established genus Lamium by recognizing four species: Lamium album, Lamium purpureum, Lamium amplexicaule, and Lamium multifidum. The name Lamium L. is the primary generic name in use today.

As of May 2024, Plants of the World Online accepts the following species:

- Lamium album L. – (white dead-nettle) – widespread across Europe + northern Asia from Spain + Norway to Japan + Kamchatka; naturalised in New Zealand + North America
- Lamium amplexicaule L. – (henbit dead-nettle) – widespread across Europe and northern Asia from Spain + Norway to Japan + Kamchatka, as well as North Africa, Ethiopia, Azores, Madeira, Canary Islands; naturalised in New Zealand, Hawaii, South America + North America
- Lamium bakhtiaricum Jamzad – Iran
- Lamium bifidum Cirillo – Mediterranean from Portugal to Romania
- Lamium bilgilii Celep – Turkey
- Lamium cappadocicum Celep & Karaer – Turkey
- Lamium caucasicum Grossh. – Caucasus (southern European Russia, Armenia, Georgia, Azerbaijan)
- Lamium confertum Fr. – (northern dead-nettle) – northern Europe from Ireland to northern Russia; naturalised in Greenland + Iceland
- Lamium coutinhoi J.G.García – Portugal
- Lamium cyrneum Paradis – Corsica
- Lamium demirizii A.P.Khokhr. – Turkey
- Lamium eriocephalum Benth. – Turkey
- Lamium flexuosum Ten. – Spain, France, Italy, Algeria, Morocco, Tunisia
- Lamium galactophyllum Boiss. & Reut. – Turkey
- Lamium galeobdolon (L.) L. – (yellow archangel) – northern + central Europe and western Asia from Spain + Denmark east to Iran + Western Siberia; naturalised in North America, New Zealand, Madeira
- Lamium garganicum L. – Mediterranean + western Asia from Portugal to Kazakhstan + Saudi Arabia
- Lamium gevorense (Gómez Hern.) Gómez Hern. & A.Pujadas – Spain, Portugal, Corsica
- Lamium glaberrimum (K.Koch) Taliev – Crimea
- Lamium × holsaticum Prahl – central Europe (L. album × L. maculatum)
- Lamium hybridum Vill. – (cut-leaved dead-nettle) – Europe, Macaronesia, North Africa
- Lamium macrodon Boiss. & A.Huet – Turkey, Caucasus, Syria, Iran, Iraq
- Lamium maculatum L. – (spotted dead-nettle) – Europe + Middle East from Portugal to Turkey; also Gansu + Xinjiang Provinces of western China
- Lamium moschatum Mill. – eastern Mediterranean (Greece, Turkey, Syria, Palestine, Cyprus)
- Lamium multifidum L. – Turkey, Caucasus
- Lamium orientale (Fisch. & C.A.Mey.) E.H.L.Krause – Turkey, Syria, Palestine
- Lamium orvala L. – Austria, Italy, Hungary, Slovenia
- Lamium purpureum L. (red dead-nettle) – northern + central Europe and western Asia from Spain + Denmark east to Caucasus + Siberia; naturalised in Korea, Taiwan, North America, New Zealand, Argentina, Falkland Islands
- Lamium taiwanense S.S.Ying – Taiwan
- Lamium × schroeteri Gams – France, Switzerland, Hungary
- Lamium tomentosum Willd. – Turkey, Caucasus, Iran, Iraq
- Lamium tschorochense A.P.Khokhr. – Turkey
- Lamium vreemanii A.P.Khokhr. – Turkey

Several closely related genera were formerly included in Lamium by some botanists, including Galeopsis (hemp-nettles) and Leonurus (motherworts).

=== Etymology ===
The generic name Lamium was used by Pliny the Elder in the first century AD. The name comes from the Greek laimos, which means "gullet", a reference to the gaping throat-like appearance of the corolla.

The common name "dead-nettle" has been derived from the German Taubnessel ("deaf nettle", or "nettle without a kernel"), and refers to the resemblance of Lamium album to the very distantly related stinging nettles, but unlike those, they do not have stinging hairs and so are harmless or apparently "dead".

== Distribution and habitat ==
The species are native to Europe, Asia. and northern Africa, but several have become very successful weeds of crop fields and are now widely naturalised across much of the temperate world.

== Ecology ==
Scanograph of Lamium moschatum

Lamium species are used as food plants by the larvae of some Lepidoptera species including angle shades, setaceous Hebrew character and the Coleophora case-bearers C. ballotella, C. lineolea and C. ochripennella.

== Cultivation ==
Lamium species are widely cultivated as groundcover, and numerous cultivars have been selected for garden use. They are frost hardy and grow well in most soils. Flower colour determines planting season and light requirement: white- and purple-coloured flowered species are planted in spring and prefer full sun. The yellow-flowered ones are planted in fall (autumn) and prefer shade. They often have invasive habits and need plenty of room.

== Cultural references ==
Louise Glück, in her 1992 collection The Wild Iris has a poem entitled Lamium, which begins, "This is how you live when you have a cold heart./ As I do: in shadows, trailing over cool rock/ under the great maple trees."

== Bibliography ==
- DeFelice, Michael S. (2005). "Henbit and the Deadnettles, Lamium spp.: Archangels or Demons?". Weed Technology. 19 (3): 768–774. Bibcode:2005WeedT..19..768D. doi:10.1614/WT-05-072.1. JSTOR 3989505.
- Gledhill, David (2008). The Names of Plants (4th ed.). Cambridge University Press. ISBN 978-0-521-86645-3.
- Linnaeus, Carl (1753). Species Plantarum: exhibentes plantas rite cognitas, ad genera relatas, cum differentiis specificis, nominibus trivialibus, synonymis selectis, locis natalibus, secundum systema sexuale digestas (1st ed.). Stockholm: Impensis Laurentii Salvii.
