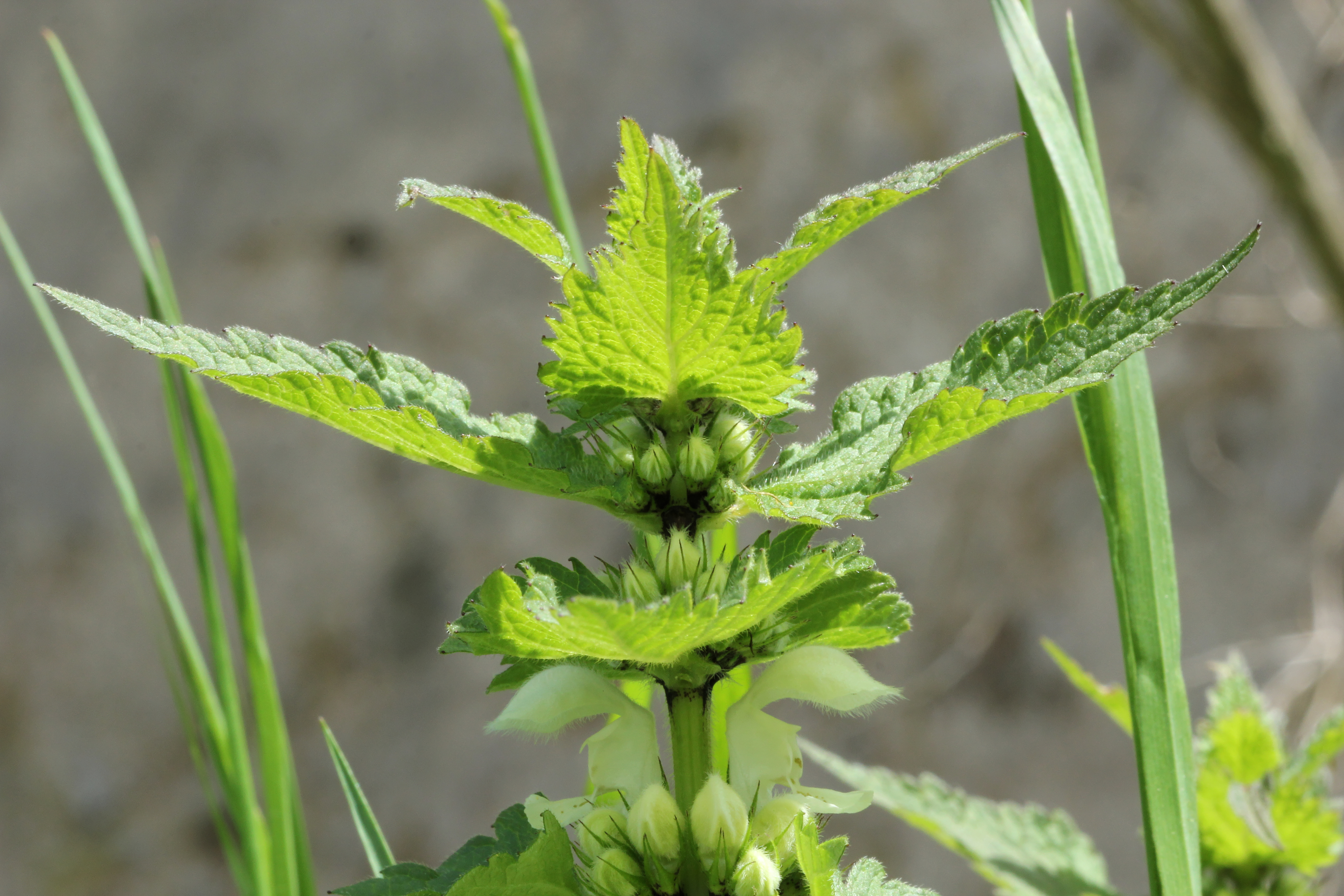
- White dead-nettle in France

Scientific classification
- Kingdom: Plantae
- Clade: Tracheophytes
- Clade: Angiosperms
- Clade: Eudicots
- Clade: Asterids
- Order: Lamiales
- Family: Lamiaceae
- Genus: Lamium
- Species: L. album

Binomial name
- Lamium album L.

= Lamium album =

Species of flowering plant

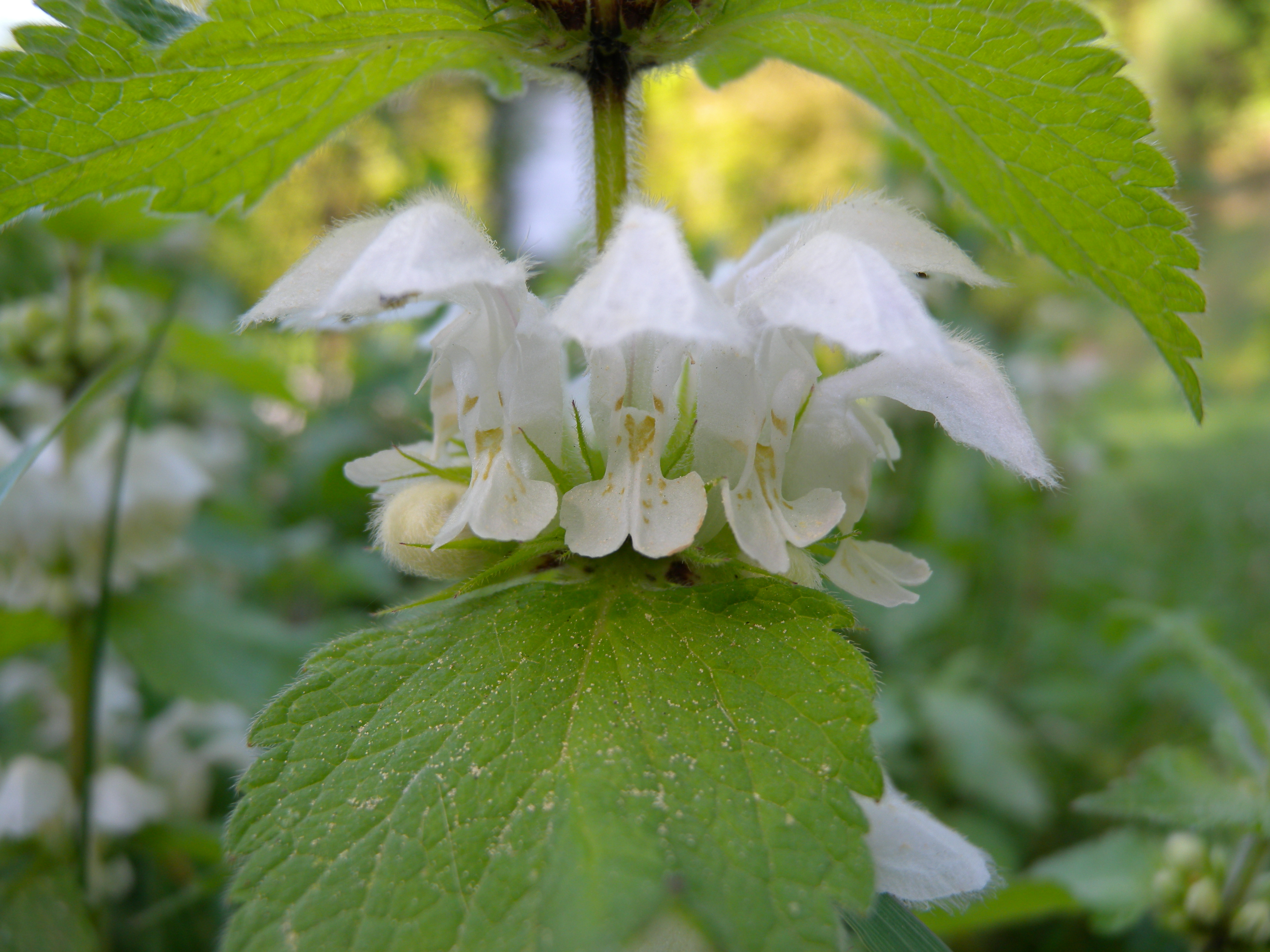
Close-up of flowers

Lamium album, commonly called white dead-nettle, is a flowering plant in the family Lamiaceae. It is native throughout Europe and Asia, growing in a variety of habitats from open grassland to woodland, generally on moist, fertile soils.

== Description ==
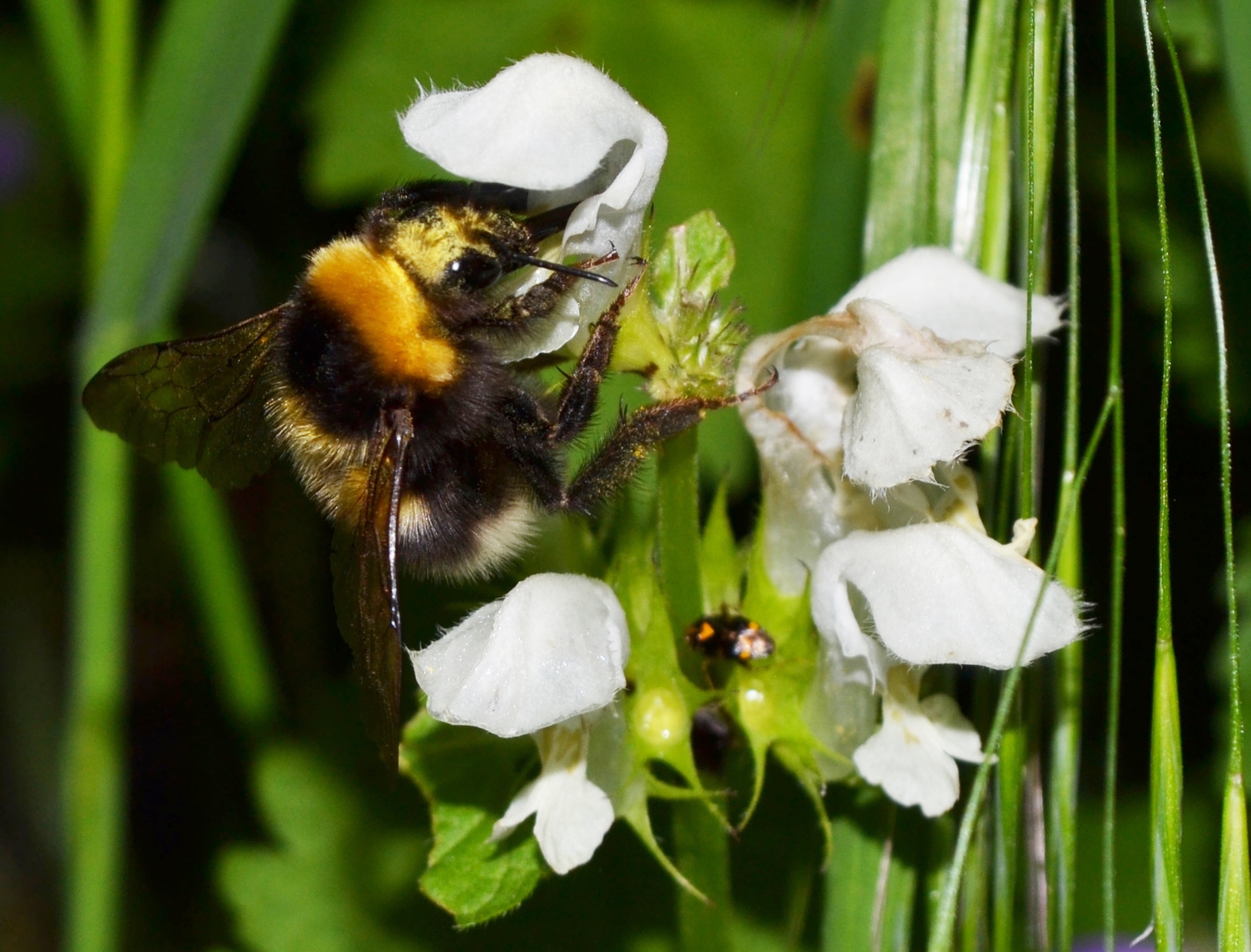
Yellow-haired male Bombus lucorum feeding from Lamium album

Lamium album is a rhizomatous herbaceous perennial plant growing to 70 cm (28 in) tall, with green, four-angled stems. The leaves are 3–8 cm (1–3 in) long and 2–5 cm (3/4–2 in) broad, triangular with a rounded base, softly hairy, and with a serrated margin and a petiole up to 5 cm (2 in) long; like many other members of the Lamiaceae, they appear superficially similar to those of the stinging nettle Urtica dioica but do not sting, hence the common name "dead-nettle". The flowers are white, produced in whorls ('verticillasters') on the upper part of the stem, the individual flowers 1.5–2.5 cm (5/8–1 in) long.

=== Phytochemistry ===
Various polyphenolic glycosides such as Lamalboside and Verbascoside, Tiliroside and 5-caffeoylquinic acid along with Rutoside and quercetin 3-O-glucoside and kaempferol 3-O-glucoside can be isolated from the flowers of L. album. The plant also contains the iridoid glycosides lamalbid, alboside A and B, and caryoptoside as well as the hemiterpene glucoside hemialboside.

L.album was a source of chlorophyll and other plant pigments for Mikhail Tsvet, the inventor of adsorption chromatography.

== Taxonomy ==
Lamium album was described and named by Carl Linnaeus in 1753.

== Distribution and habitat ==
L. album is native to Eurasia, from Ireland in the west to Japan in the east. It has three subspecies, subsp. album in the western part of the range, subsp. crinitum in the southern part in southwest Asia (Turkey to Nepal), and subsp. barbatum in the far east of mainland Asia and in Japan. It is common in England, rare in the west and northern Scotland, and introduced to eastern Ireland. It is abundant in the British Isles, where it is found on roadsides, around hedges, and in abandoned places.

L. album was introduced to North America, where it is widely naturalised.

== Ecology ==
The flowers are visited by many types of insects, but mostly by long-tongued insects, like bees. Bumblebees are especially attracted to the flowers, which are a good source of early nectar and pollen, hence the plant is sometimes called the bee nettle.

== Uses ==
The young shoots and leaves can be cooked as a vegetable.

== Cultural significance ==
A distillation of the flowers is reputed "to make the heart merry, to make a good colour in the face, and to make the vital spirits more fresh and lively."
