= Purpurea =

Purpurea, purple in Latin, may refer to:

- 8585 Purpurea, an asteroid
- Purple heron, Ardea purpurea
- Echinacea purpurea, the eastern purple coneflower or purple coneflower
- Ulmus 'Purpurea', an elm cultivar
- Sarracenia purpurea, the purple pitcher plant
- Claviceps purpurea, an ergot fungus
- Avicularia purpurea, a species of Ecuadorian tarantula

== See also ==
- Purpureum (disambiguation)
- Purpura (disambiguation)
