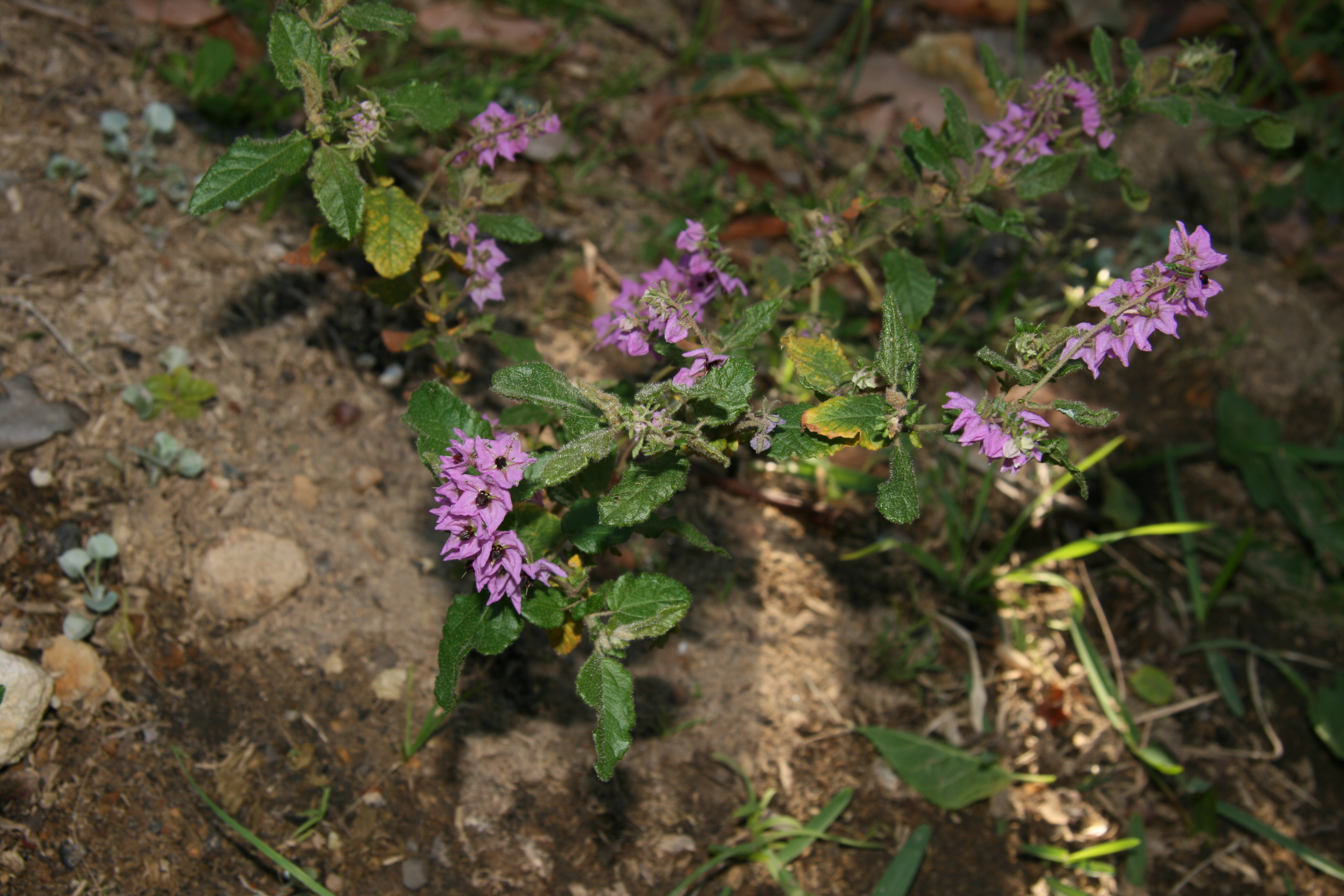

Scientific classification
- Kingdom: Plantae
- Clade: Tracheophytes
- Clade: Angiosperms
- Clade: Eudicots
- Clade: Rosids
- Order: Malvales
- Family: Malvaceae
- Genus: Thomasia
- Species: T. purpurea

Binomial name
- Thomasia purpurea (W.T.Aiton) J.Gay

Synonyms
- Lasiopetalum purpureum W.T.Aiton; Thomasia purpurea (W.T.Aiton) J.Gay var. purpurea; Thomasia rupestris Steud.

= Thomasia purpurea =

Species of shrub

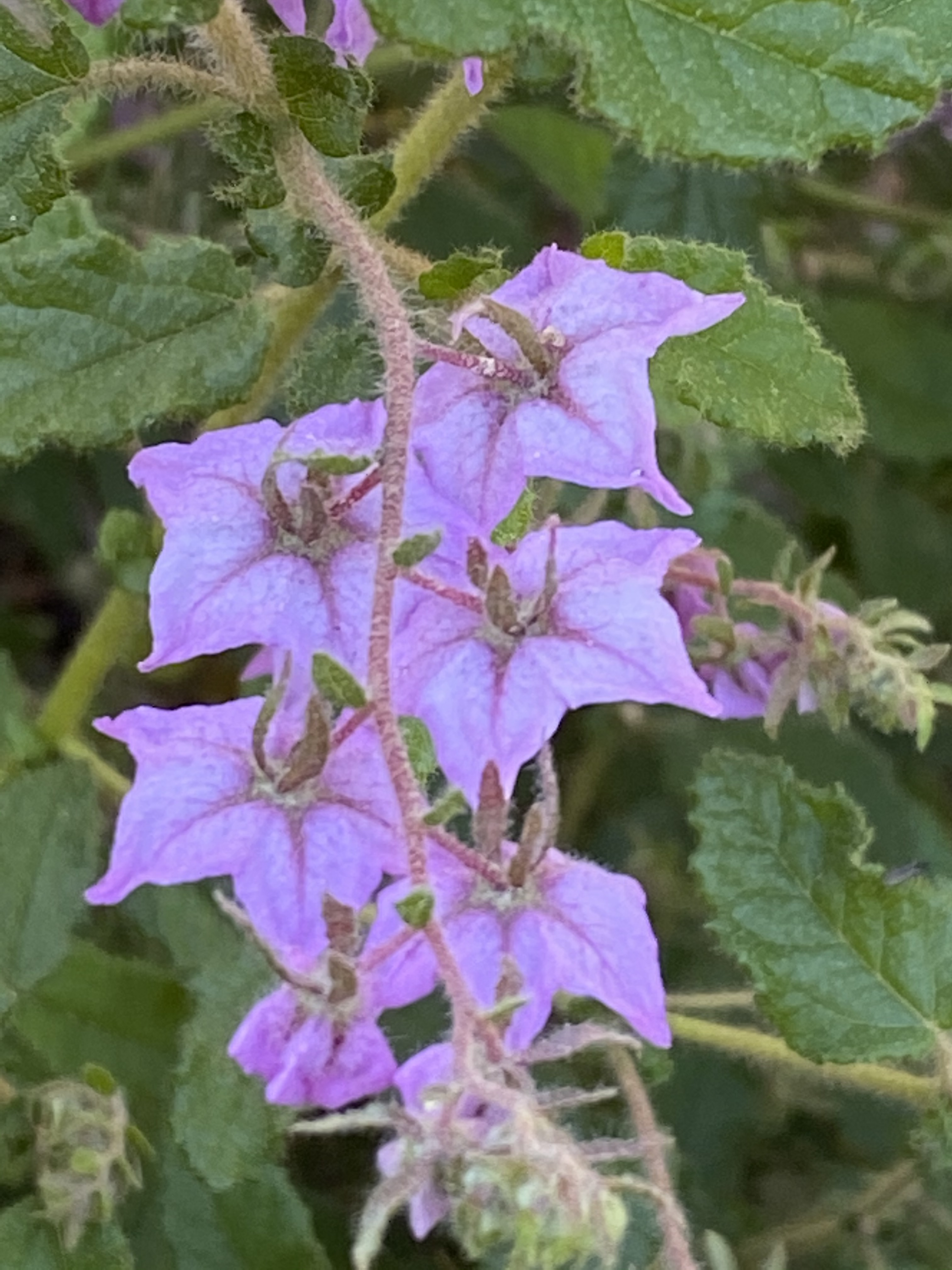
Underside of flower

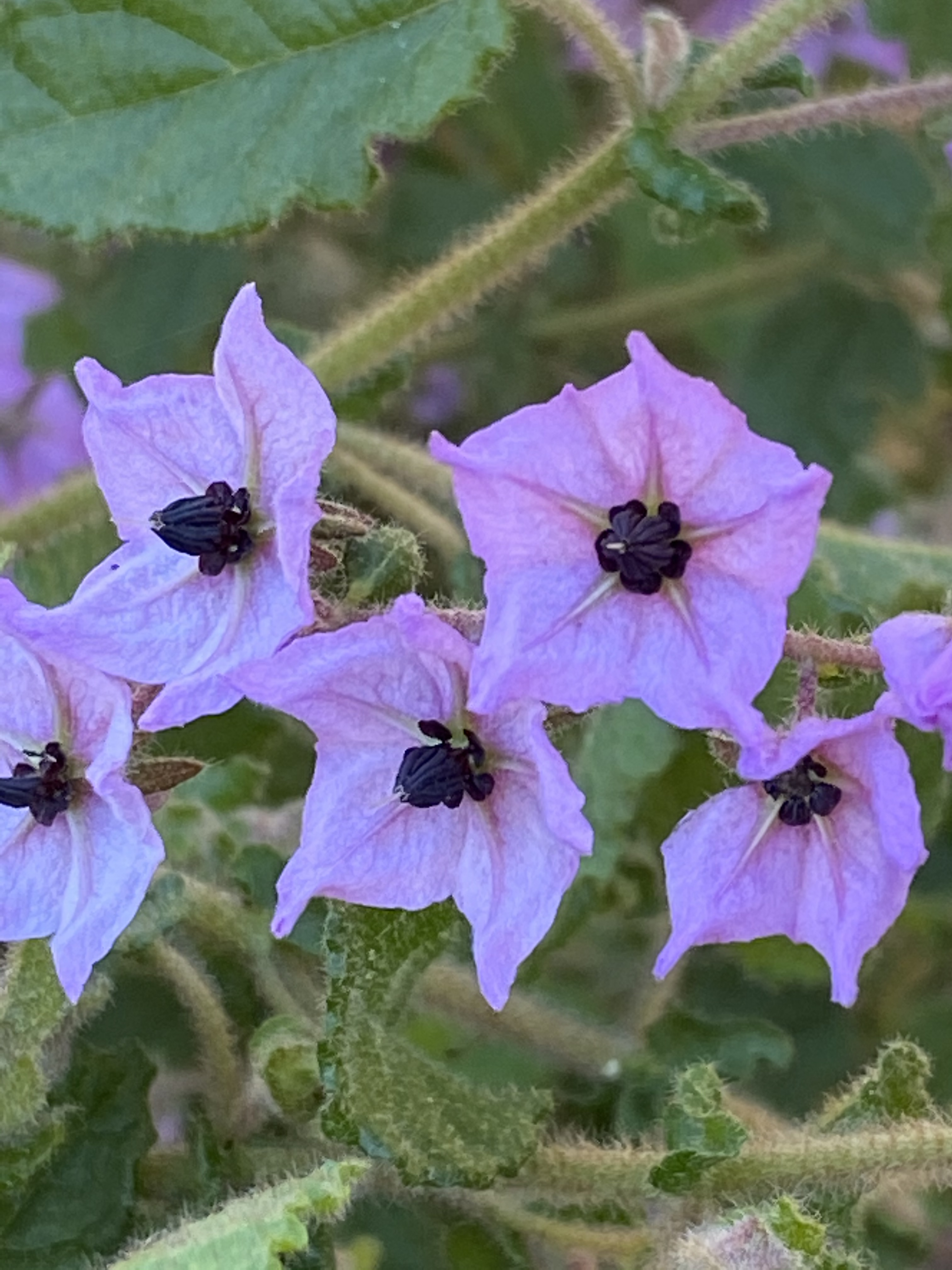
Flower

Thomasia purpurea is a small, flowering shrub in the family Malvaceae that is endemic to the southwest of Western Australia. It has green oblong-shaped leaves and pinkish purple flowers.

== Description ==
Thomasia purpurea is an upright, slender shrub usually growing to between 0.3–1.2 m (1 ft 0 in – 3 ft 11 in) high, stems covered in star-shaped hairs. It has oblong to narrow-oval shaped leaves, 1–3 cm (0.39–1.18 in) long, 7 mm (0.28 in) wide, hairy especially on the underside and wavy margins. The small flowers are cup-shaped, drooping, borne in clusters of 1–3 at the end of branches, lacking petals and calyx lobes pinkish purple. Flowering occurs between April and December.

== Taxonomy and naming ==
The species was first formally described by Swedish botanist Jonas Carlsson Dryander and the description was published in William Aiton's Hortus Kewensis in 1811 as Lasiopetalum purpureum. The type specimen was collected by botanist Robert Brown from King George Sound in 1801. In 1821 French botanist Jacques Etienne Gay placed the species in the genus Thomasia. The specific epithet (purpurea) means "purple".

== Distribution and habitat ==
This species grows in coastal regions of south-west Western Australia on ridges, flat lands, seasonally wet locations and sandy hills.
