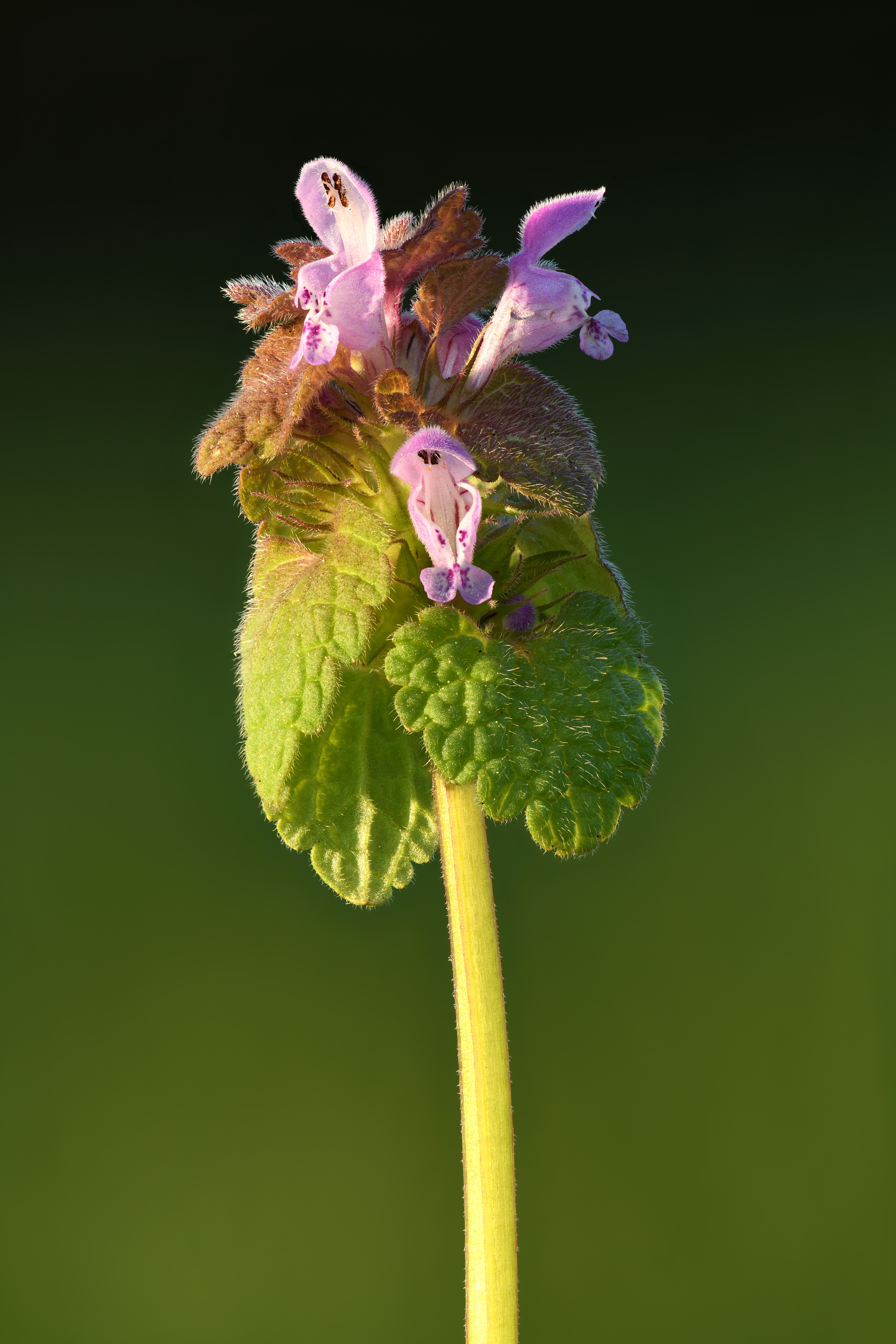

Scientific classification
- Kingdom: Plantae
- Clade: Embryophytes
- Clade: Tracheophytes
- Clade: Spermatophytes
- Clade: Angiosperms
- Clade: Eudicots
- Clade: Asterids
- Order: Lamiales
- Family: Lamiaceae
- Genus: Lamium
- Species: L. purpureum

Binomial name
- Lamium purpureum L.

Varieties
- L. purpureum var. ehrenbergii (Boiss. & Reut.) Mennema; L. purpureum var. incisum (Willd.) Pers.; L. purpureum var. moluccellifolium Schumach.; L. purpureum var. purpureum

Synonyms
- Lamiopsis purpurea (L.) Opiz

= Lamium purpureum =

Red dead-nettle

Plant species in the mint family

Lamium purpureum (from Latin purpureus 'purple'), known as red dead-nettle, purple dead-nettle, or purple archangel, is an annual herbaceous flowering plant in the mint family (Lamiaceae). It is native to Eurasia but can also be found in North America.

== Description ==
Lamium purpureum grows with square stems to 5–20 centimetres (2–8 in), rarely 40 cm (16 in), in height. The leaves have fine hairs, are green at the bottom and shade to purplish at the top; they are 2–4 centimetres (3/4–1 1/2 in) long and broad, with a 1–2 cm (1/2–3/4 in) petiole (leaf stalk), and wavy to serrated margins.

The zygomorphic flowers are bright red-purple, with the five petals fused into a corolla tube with a top hood-like lobe, two lower lip lobes and minute fang-like lobes between. This encloses the four stamens and the single style with its forked stigma. The corolla shows a line of hairs near the base of the tube. They may be produced throughout the year, including mild weather in winter.

=== Phytochemistry ===
The essential oil is characterized by its high contents of germacrene D. The seed oil contains 16% of an acid characterized as (−)-octadeca-5,6-trans-16-trienoic acid (trivial name lamenallenic acid). Other unsaturated esters identified by their cleavage products are oleate, linoleate and linolenate.

The plant contains phenylethanoid glycosides named lamiusides A, B, C, D and E. It possesses a flavonol 3-O-glucoside-6″-O-malonyltransferase.

=== Similar species ===
It is often found alongside henbit dead-nettle (Lamium amplexicaule), for which it is easily mistaken, because the two species bear not only similar leaves, but also similar bright purple flowers. They can, however, be distinguished from one another by the form of the leaves on their respective flowering stems: those of red dead-nettle are petiolate, while those of henbit dead-nettle are sessile.

Though superficially similar to species of Urtica (true nettles) in appearance, L. purpureum is not related to them, the genus Lamium belonging to the mint family, not the nettle family, the "dead" in the name "dead-nettle" referring to the inability of Lamium species to sting. L. purpureum is the type species in its genus and family; species in other Lamioideae genera may also look similar, including Stachys the "hedge nettles".

== Taxonomy ==
Lamium purpureum was described and named by Carl Linnaeus in 1753. It is the type species of genus Lamium.

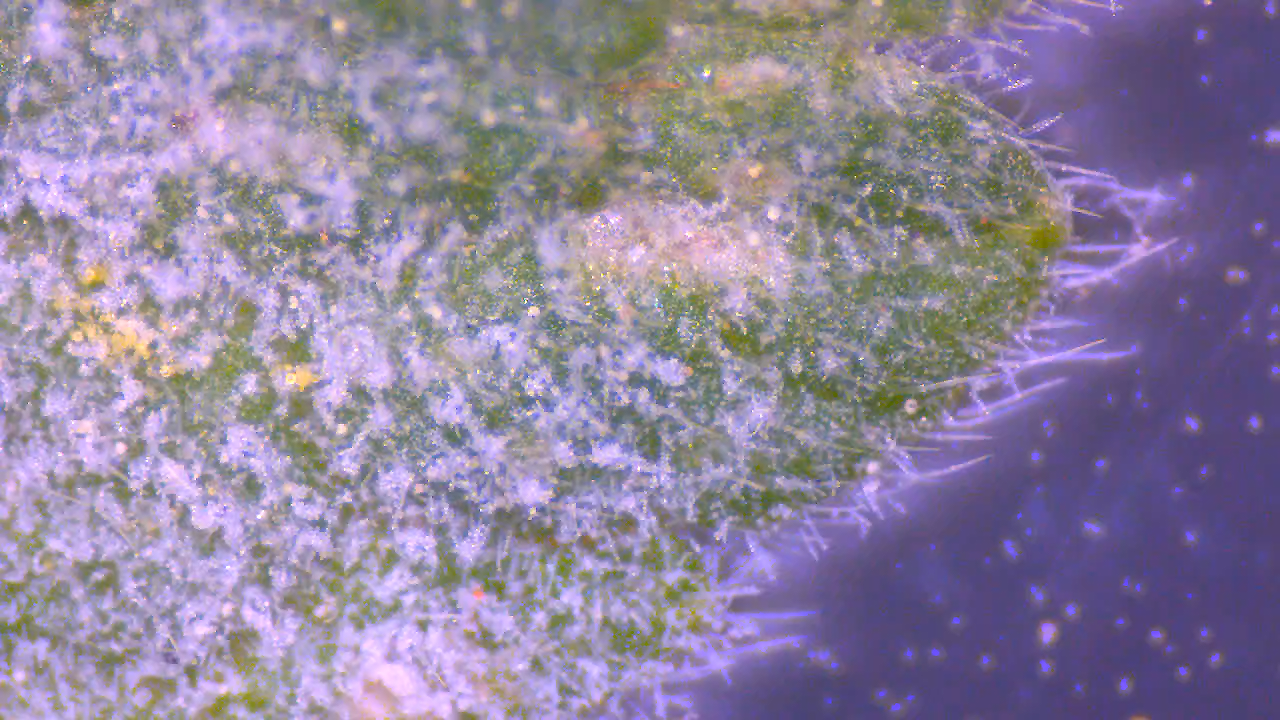
Leaf Structure of purple dead-nettle highlighting trichomes. Winston-Salem, North Carolina

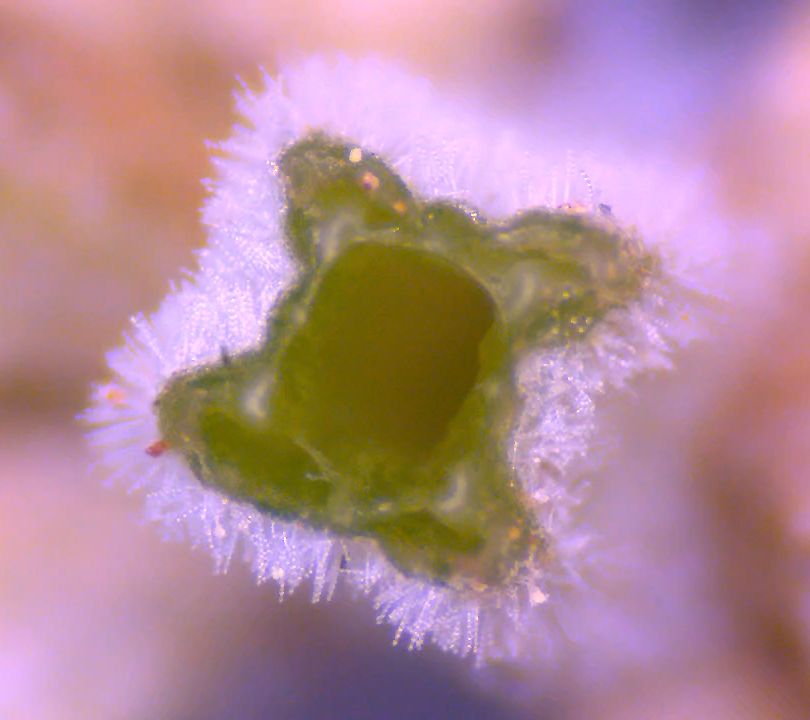
Cross-sectional cut of purple dead-nettle stem featuring trichome structures. Winston-Salem, North Carolina

== Distribution and habitat ==
Lamium purpureum is native and relatively common to Europe (including Britain and Ireland) and Asia but it can also be found in North America: especially in the western and eastern United States, and Canada. It frequently occurs in meadows, forest edges, roadsides and gardens.

== Ecology ==
The year-round flowers allow bees to gather their nectar for food when few other nectar sources are available. It is also a prominent source of pollen for bees in March/April (in UK), when bees need the pollen as protein to build up their nest. The pollen is crimson red in colour and thus very noticeable on the heads of the bees that visit its flowers.

== Uses ==
Young plants have edible tops and leaves, which can be used in salads or stir-fried as a spring vegetable. When finely chopped, they can also be added to sauces. The flowers can be crystallized using sugar and egg white.

The herb has a venerable pedigree in the folk medicine of England, featuring as it does as one of three medicinal/symbolic plants called for in the Anglo-Saxon herb charm Wið færstice [wið ˈfæːrˌsti.t͡ʃe] (meaning 'against a sudden/violent stabbing pain'). The charm in question (dating, according to scholarly consensus, probably from the late ninth century) calls for the three herbs involved (the other two being feverfew and plantain) to be heated in butter to prepare an ointment, which is then rubbed on the site of the pain with the blade of a knife, while the lengthy charm is recited by the folk practitioner, who thereby aligns herself (or himself) with the patient – in contradistinction to the evil supernatural beings believed to have caused the pain with their magical arrows.

To this day, herbalists use red dead-nettle in many herbal remedies. One of these is a salve prepared from the plant which can be used topically to soothe irritated, itchy, or sore skin. Studies show a strong antioxidant effect.

== Gallery ==
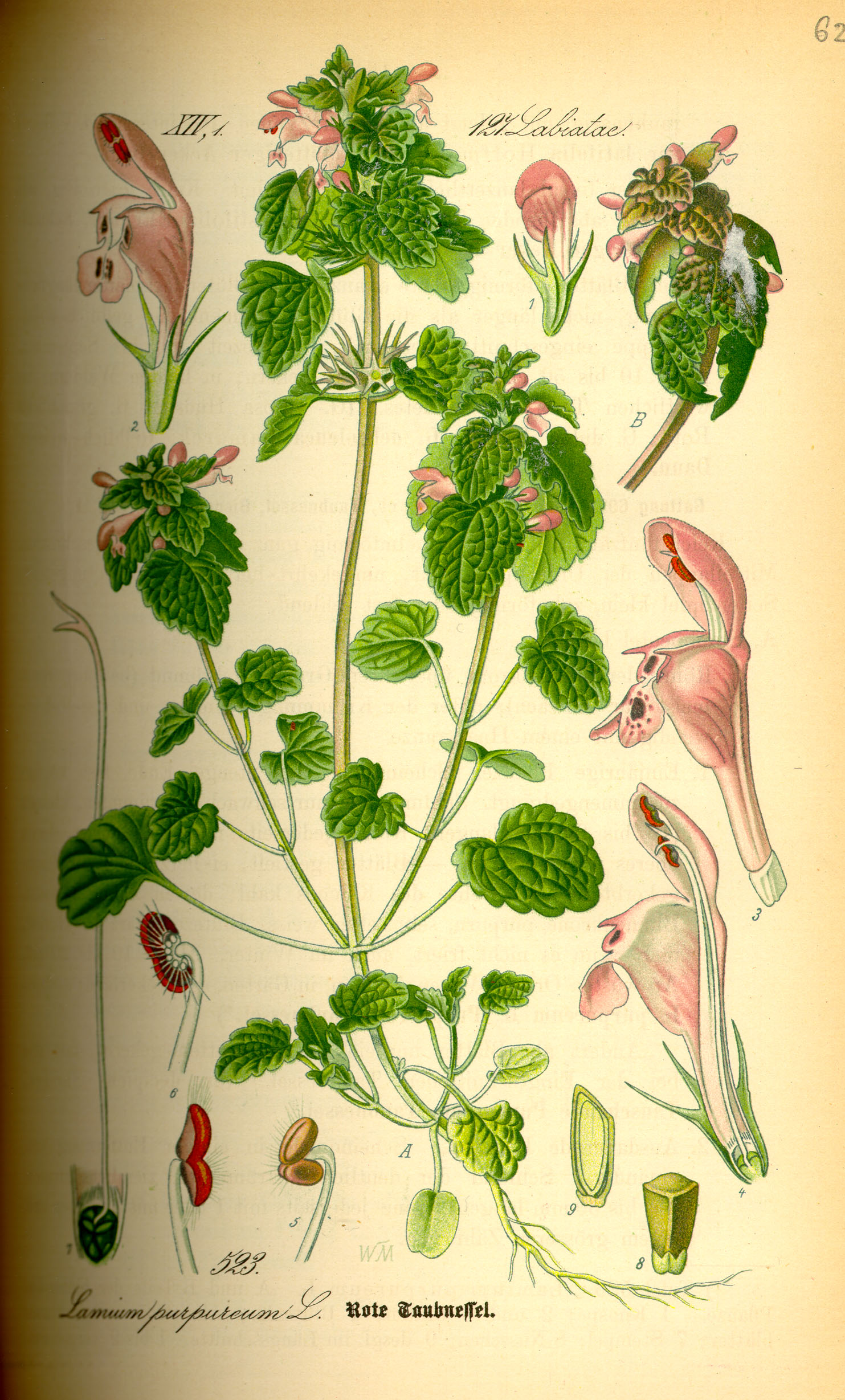
1885 illustration

Leaf detail

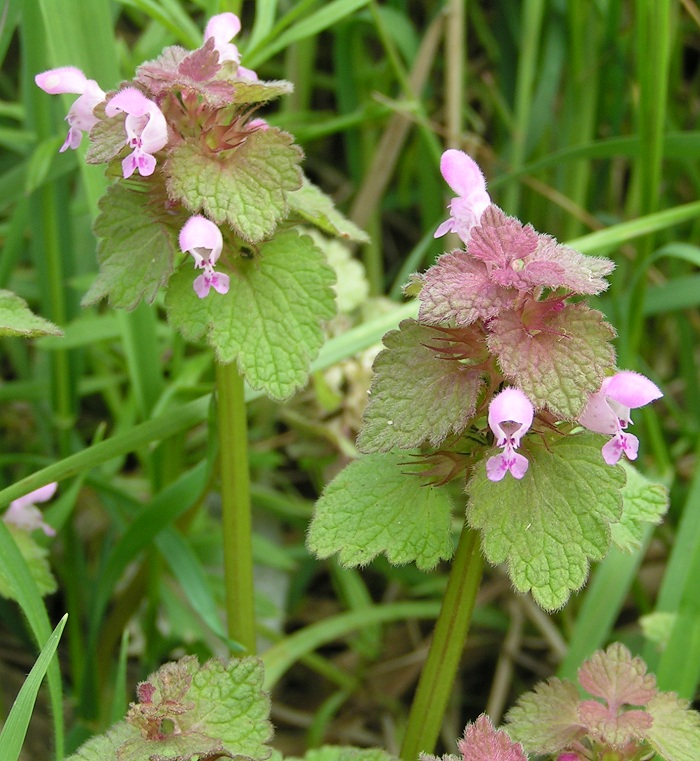
Essex, England,
United Kingdom

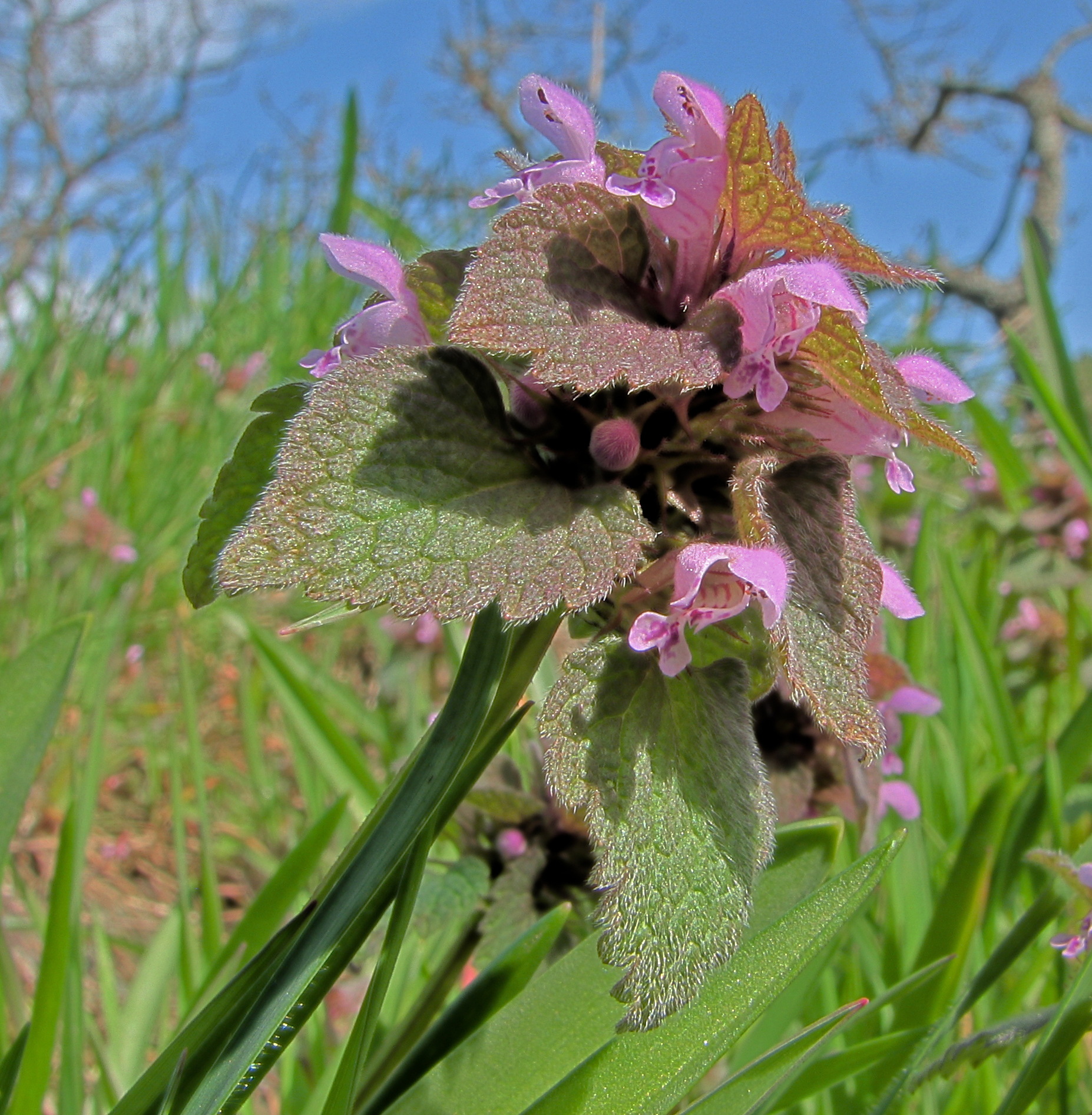
Vancouver Island,
British Columbia, Canada

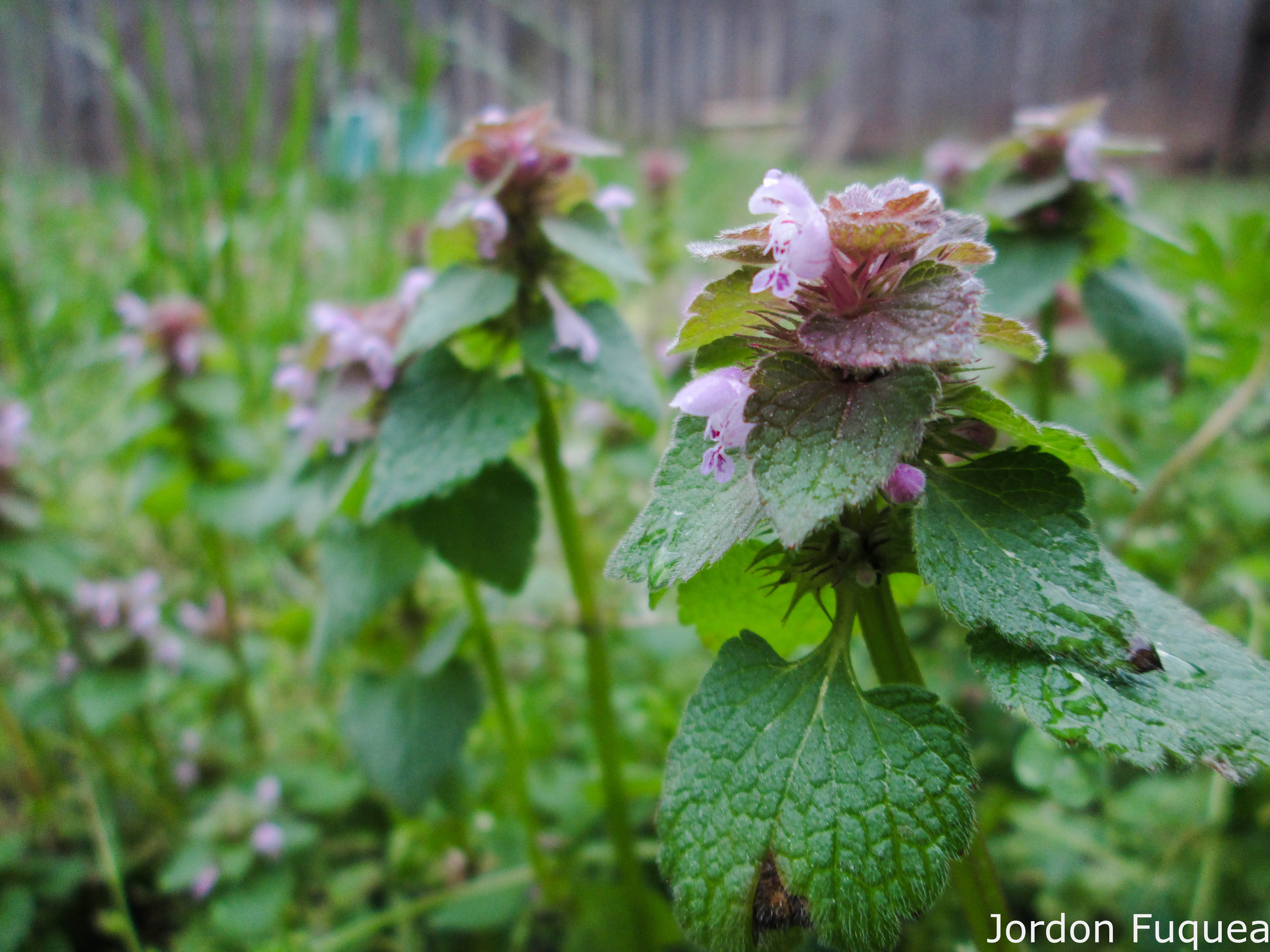
Calhoun, Georgia

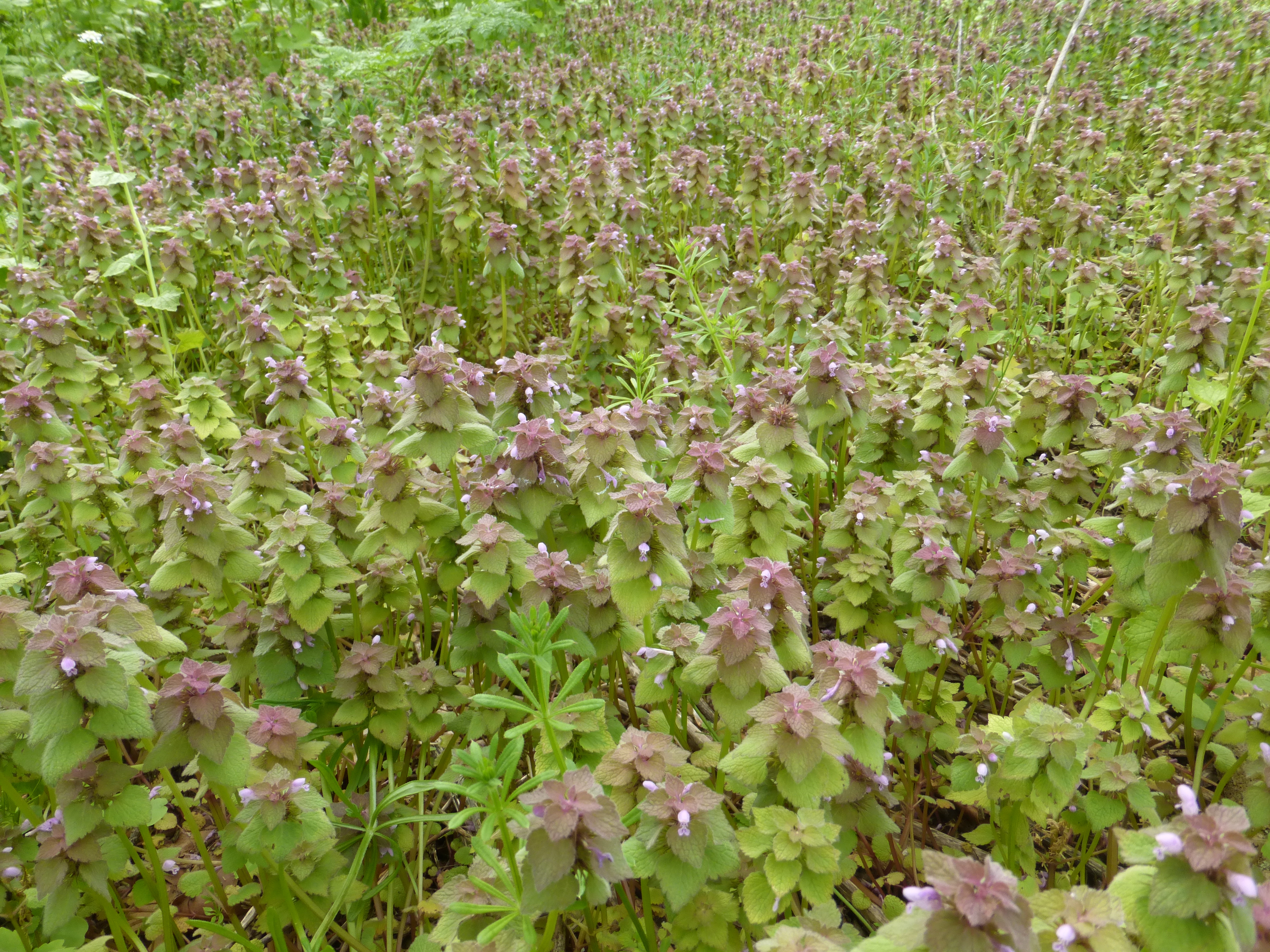
Field in Ohio, US

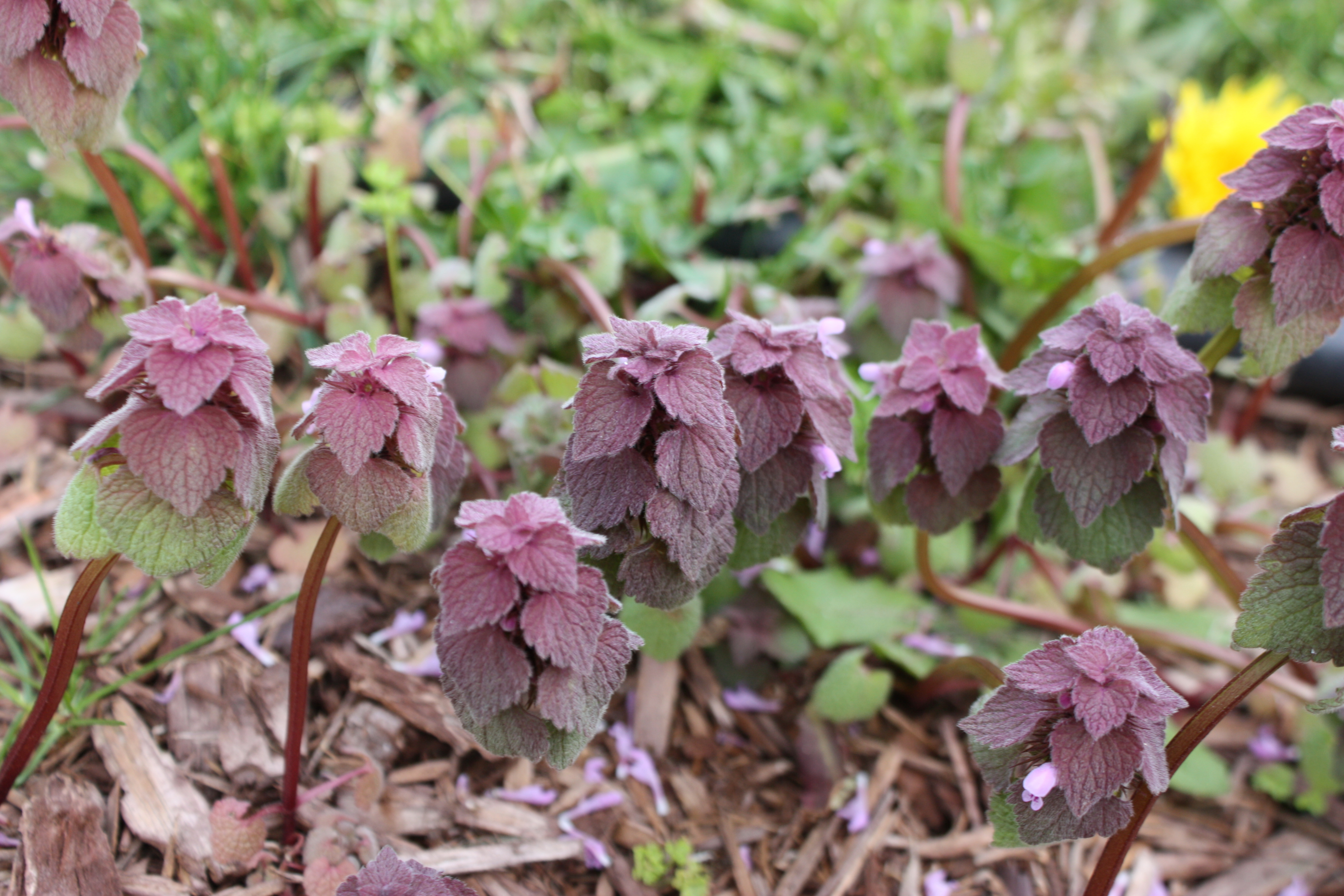
Whatcom County, Washington, April 2022

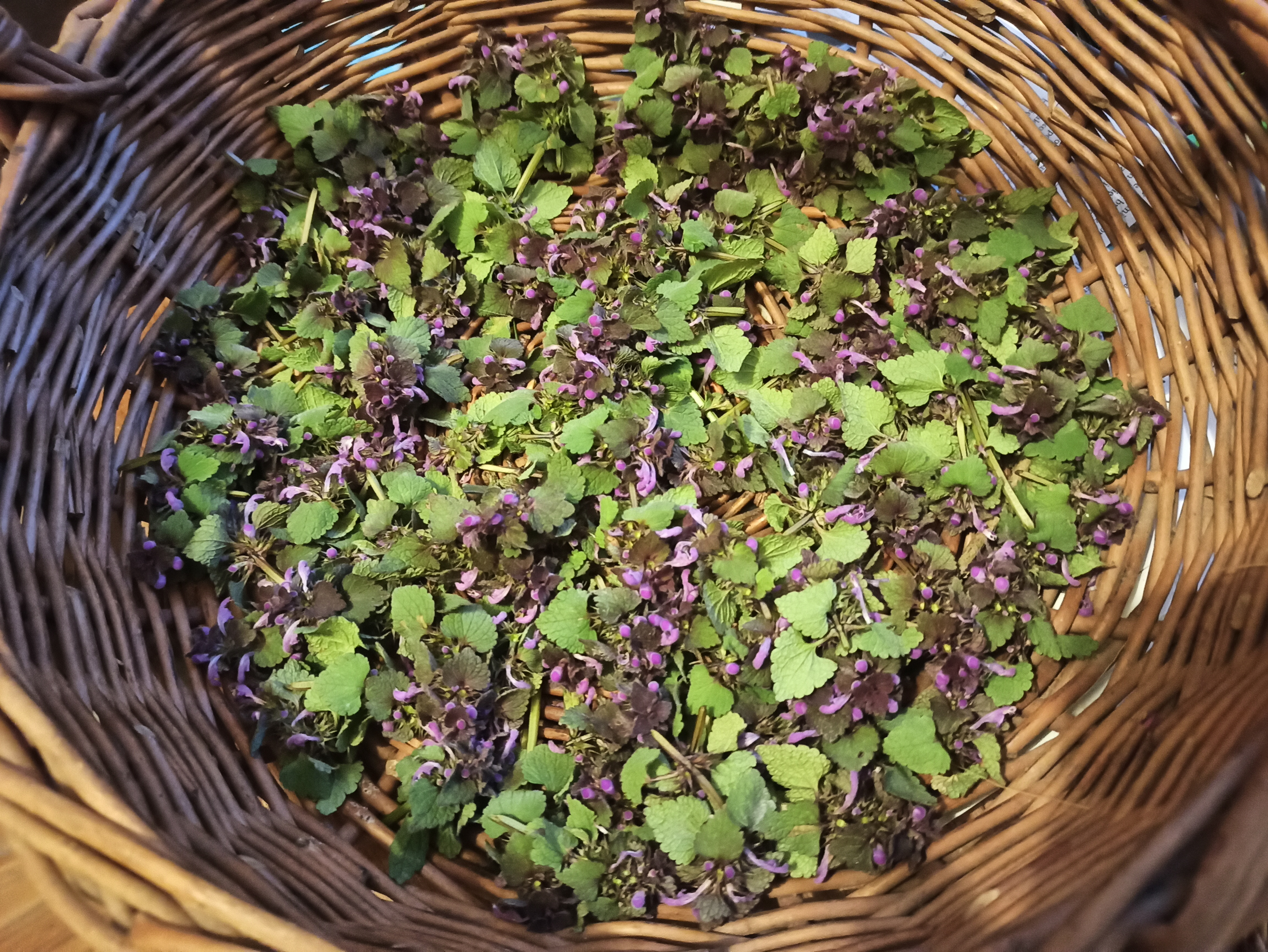
Drying red dead-nettle as a medicinal plant in a wicker basket, Poland

== Bibliography ==
- Mennema, J. (1989). A taxonomic revision of Lamium (Lamiaceae) (PDF). Leiden Botanical Series. Vol. 11. Leiden, The Netherlands: E. J. Brill. pp. 1–196. ISBN 90-04-09109-2.
