= C18H24O3 =

The molecular formula C_{18}H_{24}O_{3} may refer to:

- 10β,17β-Dihydroxyestra-1,4-dien-3-one
- Doisynolic acid
- Epiestriol
- 16β,17α-Epiestriol
- 17α-Epiestriol
- Estriol
- Hydroxyestradiols
  - 15α-Hydroxyestradiol
  - 2-Hydroxyestradiol
  - 4-Hydroxyestradiol
- Ketoisanic acid
- Refisolone
