= C18H26O2 =

The molecular formula C_{18}H_{26}O_{2} (molar mass: 274.40 g/mol, exact mass: 274.1933 u) may refer to:

- Empenthrin, or vaporthrin
- Exocarpic acid, a rare fatty acid
- Isanic acid, a fatty acid
- Nandrolone, or 19-nortestosterone
