= Stearolic acid =

Names
- IUPAC name octadec-9-ynoic acid
- Other names 9-octadecynoic acid

Identifiers
CAS Number	506-24-1
3D model (JSmol)	Interactive image
ChEBI	CHEBI:28801
ChEMBL	ChEMBL482804
ChemSpider	61475
ECHA InfoCard	100.007.301
EC Number	208-030-8
KEGG	C08459
PubChem CID	68167
UNII	7M9KFA3WKU
CompTox Dashboard (EPA)	DTXSID90198647
- InChI: InChI=1S/C18H32O2/c1-2-3-4-5-6-7-8-9-10-11-12-13-14-15-16-17-18(19)20/h2-8,11-17H2,1H3,(H,19,20) Key: RGTIBVZDHOMOKC-UHFFFAOYSA-N
- SMILES: CCCCCCCCC#CCCCCCCCC(=O)O

Properties
Chemical formula	C_{18}H_{32}O_{2}
Molar mass	280.452 g·mol^{−1}
Appearance	solid
Melting point	45 °C (113 °F; 318 K)
Solubility in water	practically insoluble
- Except where otherwise noted, data are given for materials in their standard state (at 25 °C [77 °F], 100 kPa). Infobox references

Stearolic acid is an acetylenic fatty acid characterized by an 18-carbon chain with a triple bond between carbons 9 and 10. It is a rare, naturally occurring unsaturated fatty acid, notable for its unique chemical structure and occurrence in certain plant species. Its structural formula is CH_{3}(CH_{2})_{7}C≡C(CH_{2})_{7}COOH. Its delta notation is 18:1Δ9a.

Stearolic acid is classified as an octadecynoic acid, specifically with the triple bond at the 9-position, hence its common name, 9-octadecynoic acid.

== Natural occurrence ==
Stearolic acid has been reported to occur in lipids of plant origin, in particular in the seed oil of Pyrularia edulis, Pyrularia pubera, Santalum album, Santalum acuminatum, Acanthosyris spinescens, and Exocarpus cupressiformis. Oils with a high stearolic acid content are drying oils that polymerize in relatively short times.

Its presence in these plants is relatively rare compared to more common fatty acids, such as stearic and oleic acids.

Stearolic acid is considered to be the main precursor of other acetylenic fatty acids, in particular ximenynic acid and exocarpic acid, with which it is frequently identified.

== Synthesis ==
Stearolic acid can be synthesized from oleic acid through a process involving halogenation of the alkene followed by double dehydrohalogenation to form a triple bond. The net effect is conversion of the double bond to a triple bond at the same location on the fatty acid chain.

The oleic to stearolic acid path

== Physical properties ==
The acid is practically insoluble in water, but readily soluble in diethyl ether and hot ethanol.

Stearolic acid crystallizes in the monoclinic crystal system in the space group C 2h with the lattice parameters a = 9.551 Å; b = 4.686 Å, c = 49.15 Å and β = 53.4° and four formula units per unit cell.

== Chemical properties ==
Ozonolysis of stearolic acid yields 9,10-dioxostearic acid, having two ketone groups at the site where the alkyne was. This compound can also be formed by reacting stearolic acid with potassium permanganate, although depending on the pH during the reaction, cleavage of the carbon chain can also occur.

When reacted with molten potassium hydroxide, stearolic acid decomposes into myristic acid and acetic acid.

== Biological and chemical significance ==
Acetylenic fatty acids like stearolic acid are of interest for their unique chemical reactivity and potential biological activities. However, detailed studies on the biological roles and applications of stearolic acid are limited compared to more common fatty acids.
