= C18H32O2 =

The molecular formula C_{18}H_{32}O_{2} (molar mass: 280.44 g/mol) may refer to:

- Chaulmoogric acid
- Conjugated linoleic acid
- Laballenic acid, rare fatty acid
- Linoleic acid
- Linoelaidic acid
- Malvalic acid
- Rumenic acid, bovinic acid
- Stearolic acid, acetylenic fatty acid
- Tariric acid, acetylenic fatty acid
- Taxoleic acid, saturated fatty acid
