= Native cherry =

Native cherry is a common name for several Australian plant species with edible fruit;

- Exocarpos cupressiformis
- Exocarpos sparteus
