= C20H36O2 =

The molecular formula C_{20}H_{36}O_{2} may refer to:

- Eicosadienoic acid
- Phlomic acid
- Sclareol
