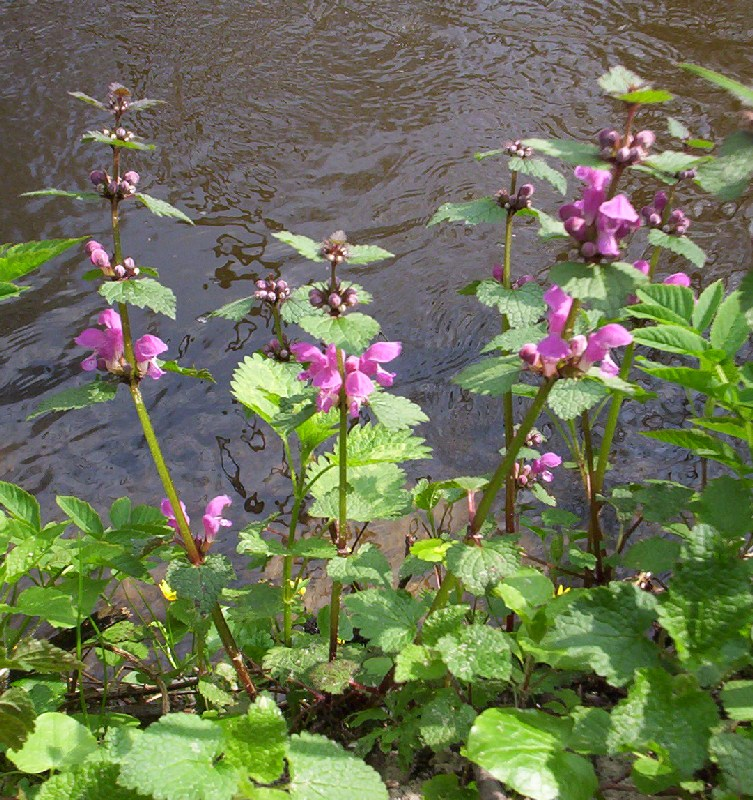

Scientific classification
- Kingdom: Plantae
- Clade: Tracheophytes
- Clade: Angiosperms
- Clade: Eudicots
- Clade: Asterids
- Order: Lamiales
- Family: Lamiaceae
- Genus: Lamium
- Species: L. maculatum

Binomial name
- Lamium maculatum (L.) L.

Synonyms
- List: Lamium affine Guss. & Ten.; Lamium album var. maculatum L.; Lamium cardiaca Cogn.; Lamium columnae Ten.; Lamium elegantissimum Schur; Lamium foliosum Crantz; Lamium grandiflorum Willd. ex Benth.; Lamium grenieri Mutel; Lamium gundelsheimeri K.Koch; Lamium hirsutum Lam.; Lamium laevigatum L.; Lamium melissifolium Mill.; Lamium mutabile Dumort.; Lamium niveum Schrad.; Lamium pallidiflorum Beck; Lamium rubrum Jenk.; Lamium rugosum Aiton; Lamium stoloniferum Lapeyr.; Lamium tillii Ten.; Lamium truncatum Boiss.; Lamium villosifolium (R.R.Mill) A.P.Khokhr.

= Lamium maculatum =

Plant species in the mint family

Lamium maculatum (also known as spotted dead-nettle, spotted henbit and purple dragon) is a species of flowering plant in the family Lamiaceae, native throughout Europe and temperate Asia (Lebanon, Syria, Turkey, western China).

== Description ==
Lamium maculatum is a prostrate, spreading herbaceous perennial. This species is very variable in terms of leaf size and shape, hairiness and flower colours. It reaches on average 20–80 centimetres (7.9–31.5 in) in height. It has erect, hollow and pubescent stems, branched at the base only. The soft hairy leaf blades are about 2–10 centimetres (0.79–3.94 in) long. They are sometimes spotted (hence the Latin name maculatum), toothed with long petioles, about 2–4 centimetres (0.79–1.57 in) long. Their shape varies from ovate-triangular to heart-shaped. The inflorescence bears about two to eight hermaphrodite flowers about 20–30 millimetres (0.79–1.18 in) long. The flowers of the plant are formed in the leaf axils of the upper leaf pairs. The upper lips of the flowers are helmet-shaped, usually pink or purplish, while the bilobate lower ones are whitish with purple dots. The stamens are located in the upper lip and have orange pollen. The flowering period extends from April through November.

It tends to grow higher in spring while during the colder weather it is much flatter to the ground. If subjected to light frost, L. maculatum will recover in spring as it enters its growth cycle.

The plant is a source of lamenallenic acid, a rare fatty acid.

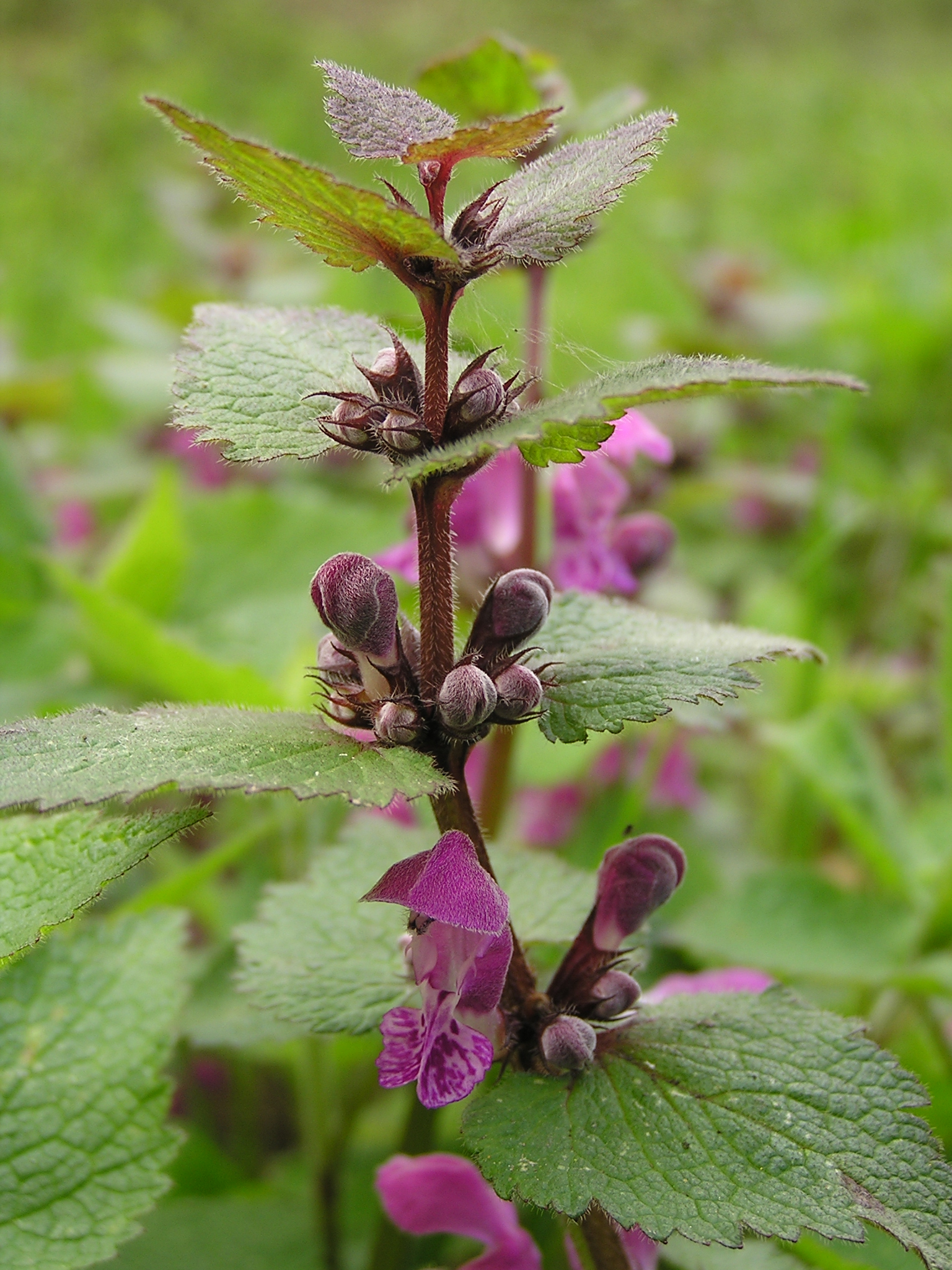
Form

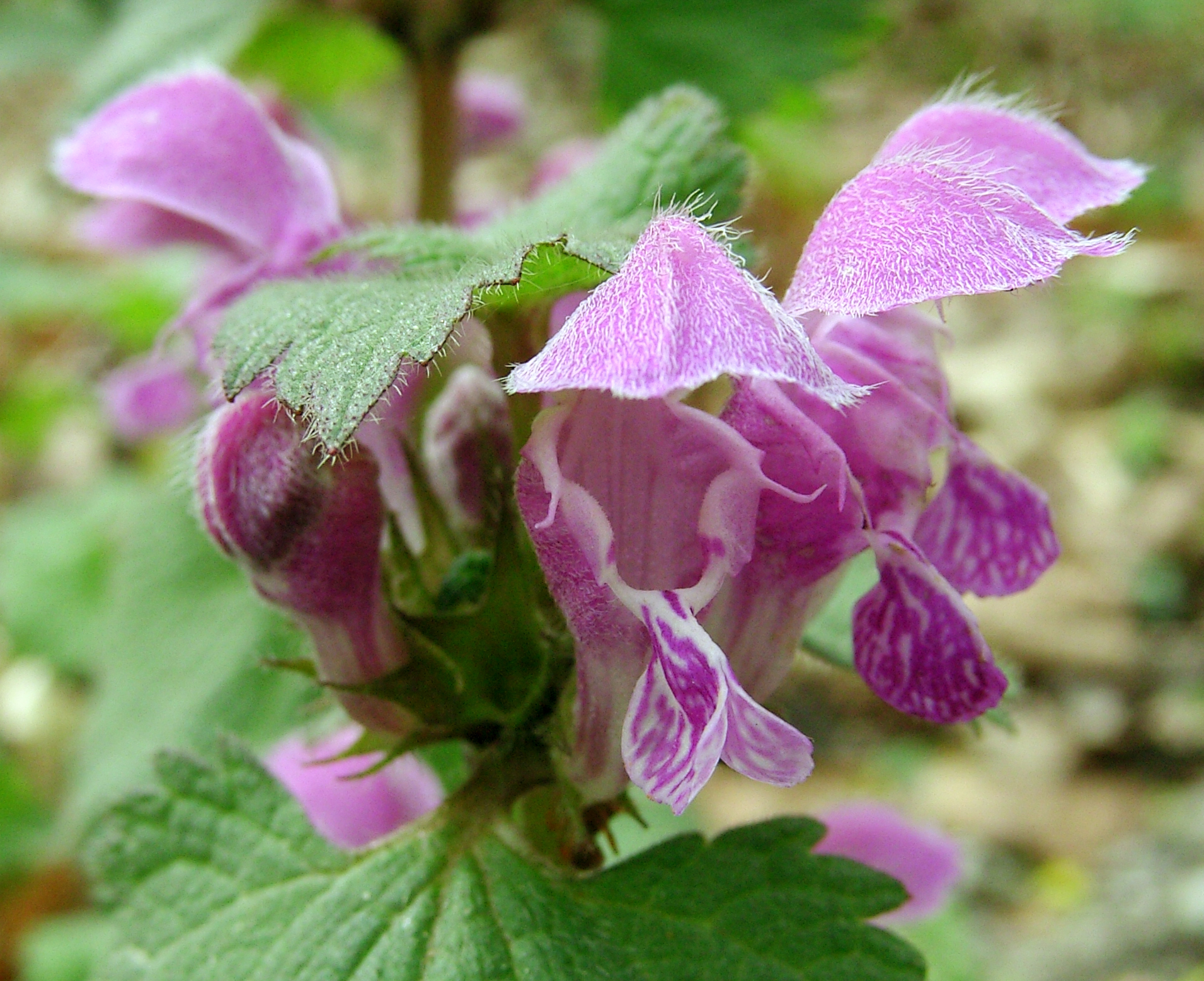
Flowers

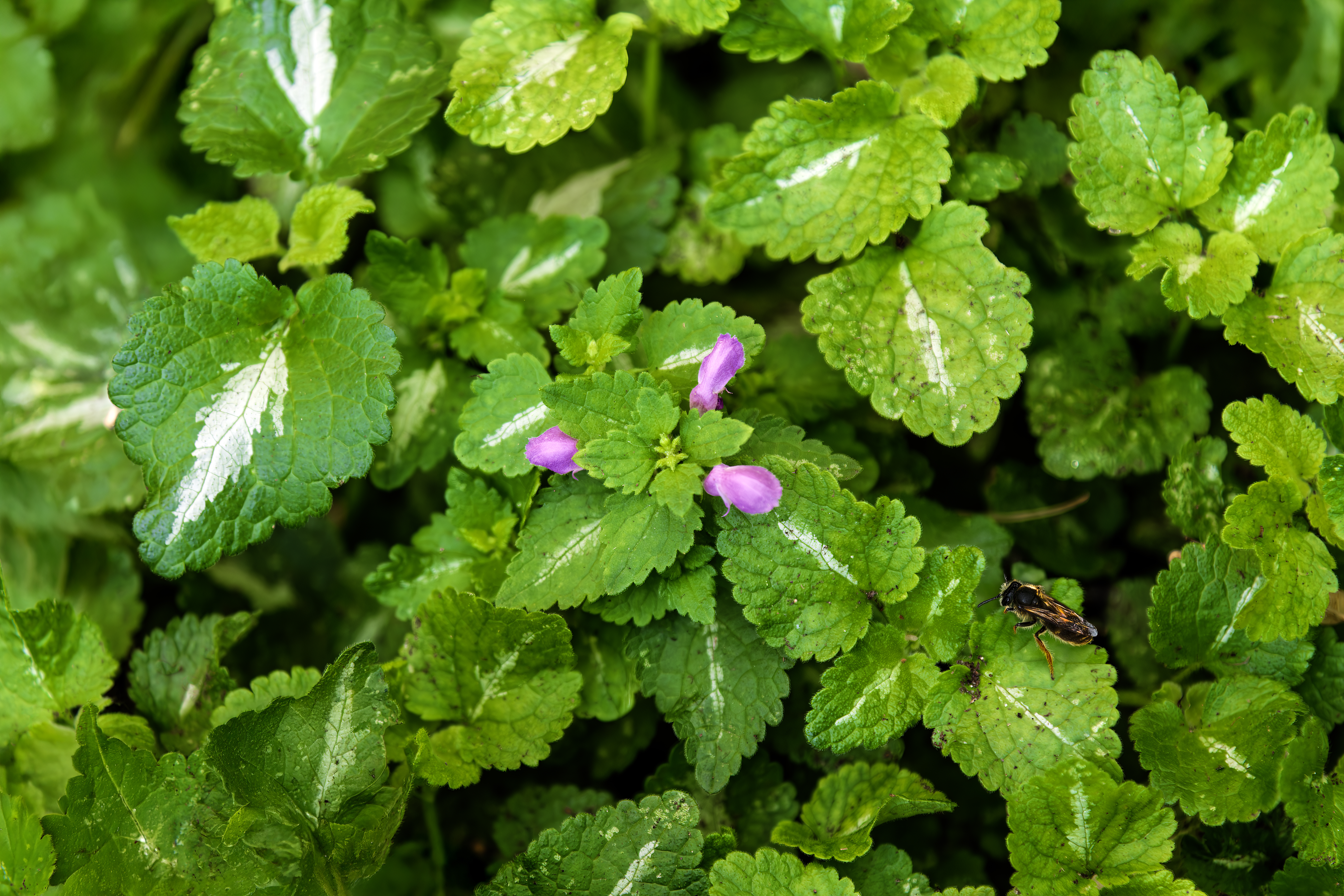
Leaves

== Taxonomy ==
Lamium maculatum was described and named by Carl Linnaeus in 1763.

== Habitat ==
It grows in a variety of habitats from open grassland to woodland, generally on moist, fertile soils at an altitude of 0–1,500 metres (0–4,921 ft) above sea level.

== Cultivation ==
Lamium maculatum is valued as groundcover in moist, shady areas. It will rapidly colonise an area, and may become invasive given suitable growing conditions. Numerous cultivars have been developed, mainly for their coloured and variegated leaves, including:-

- 'Album' (white form)
- 'Anne Greenaway'(leaves marbled with light and dark green, chartreuse and silver, flowers mauve-pink).
- 'Aureum' (yellow-leaved)
- 'Beacon Silver' (silver leaves)
- 'Cannon's Gold' (gold leaves)
- 'Chequers' (vigorous, silver-striped leaves)
- 'Purple Dragon' has unusually purple snapdragon-type flowers several times a year, over bright silver foliage with a green edge: it grows 4–8 in (102–203 mm) tall in shaded or partially shaded areas.
- 'Red Nancy' (silver leaves with green margins)
- 'Roseum' (leaves with a central silver stripe)
- 'Sterling Silver' (silver leaves)
- 'White Nancy'
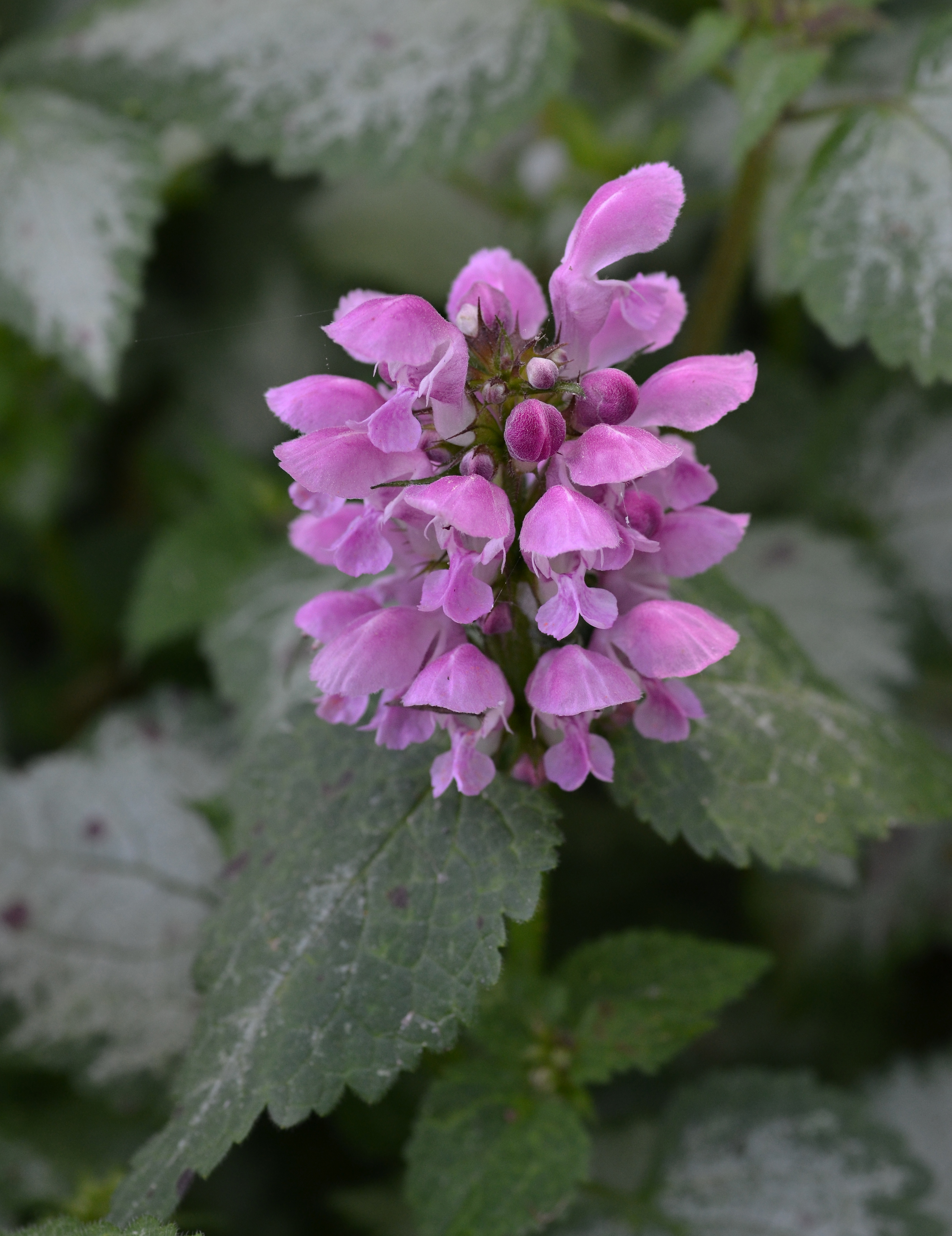
'Beacon Silver'

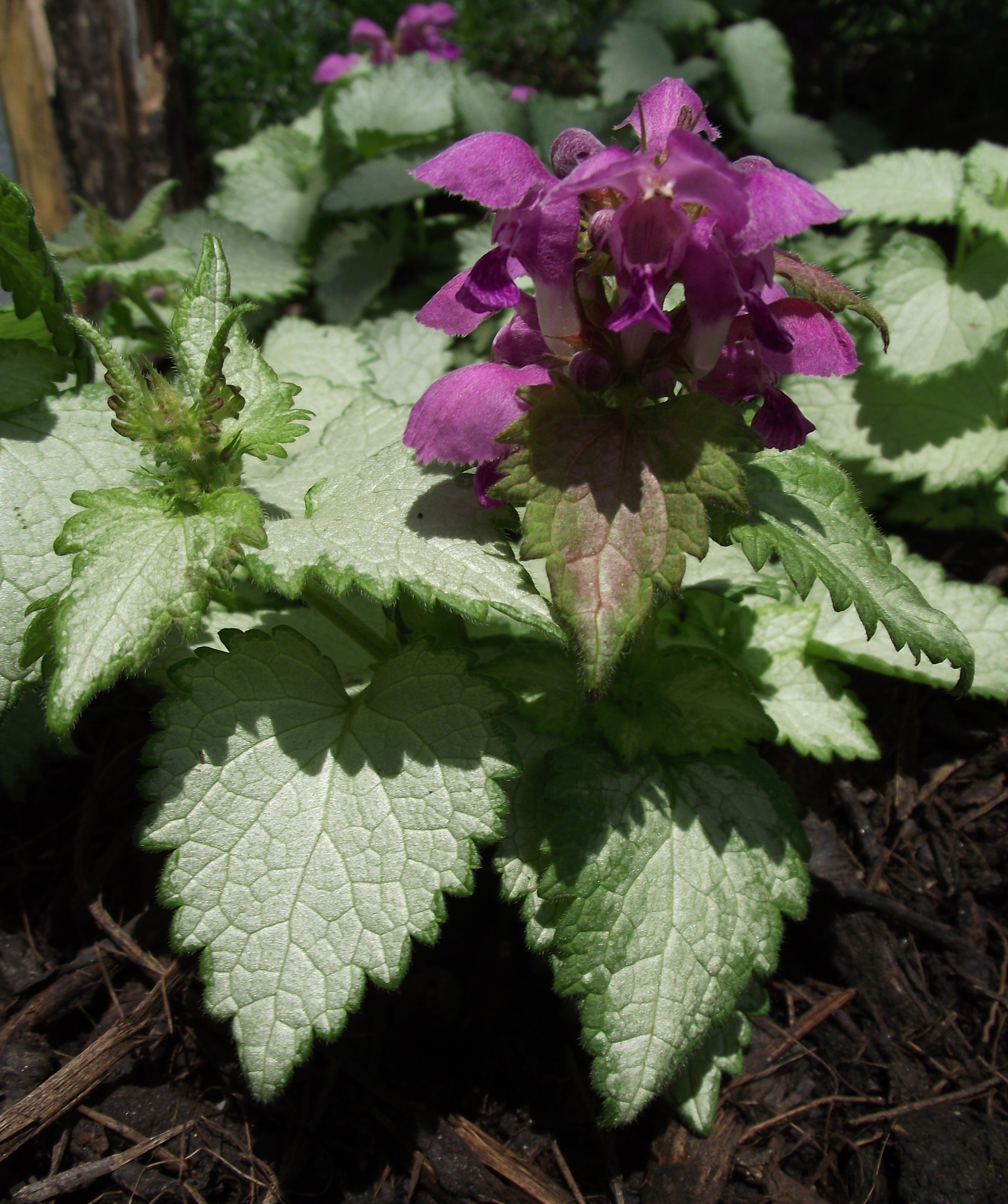
'Ghost'

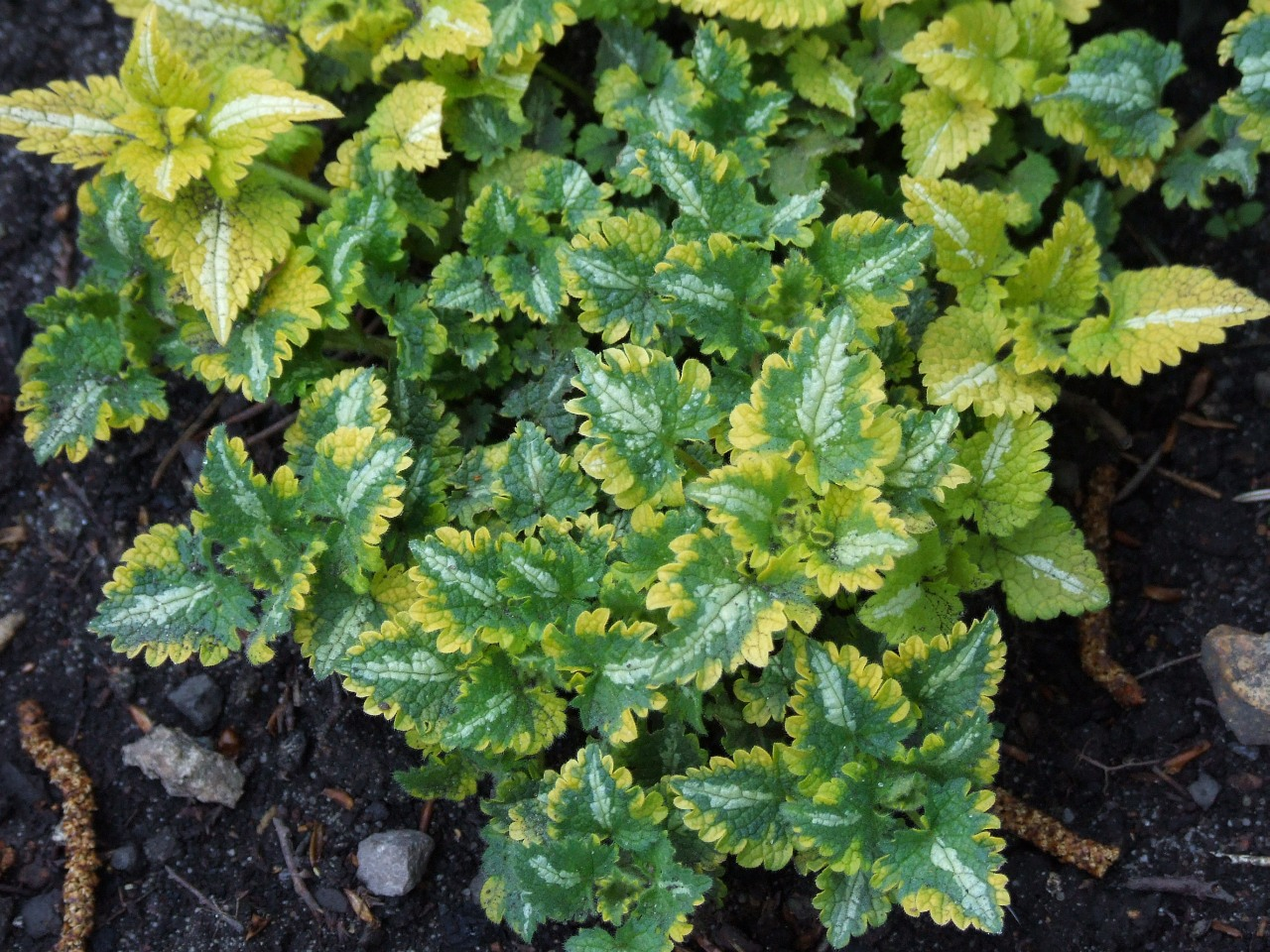
'Pink Nancy'

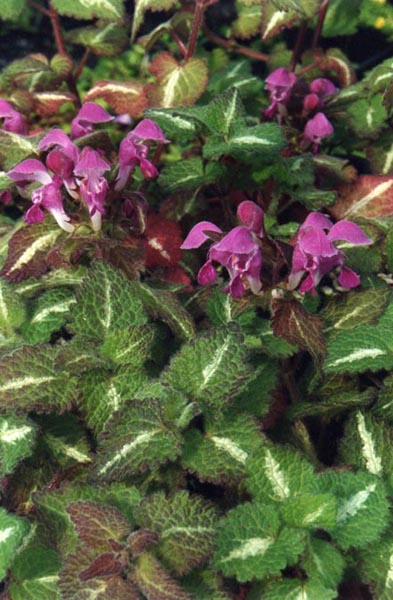
'Roseum'

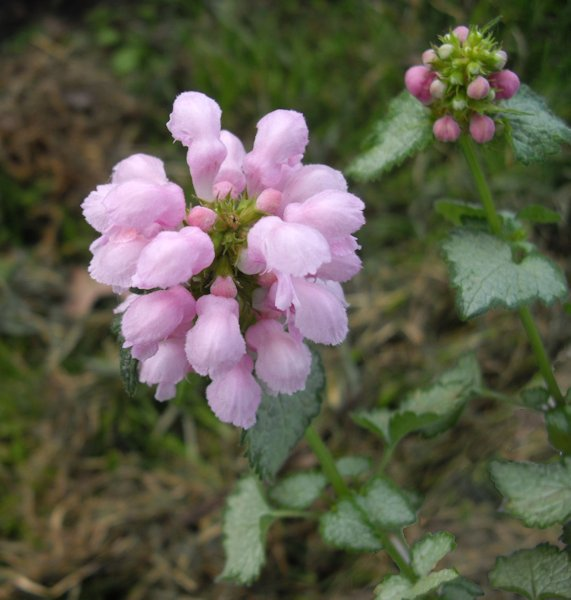
'Shell Pink'

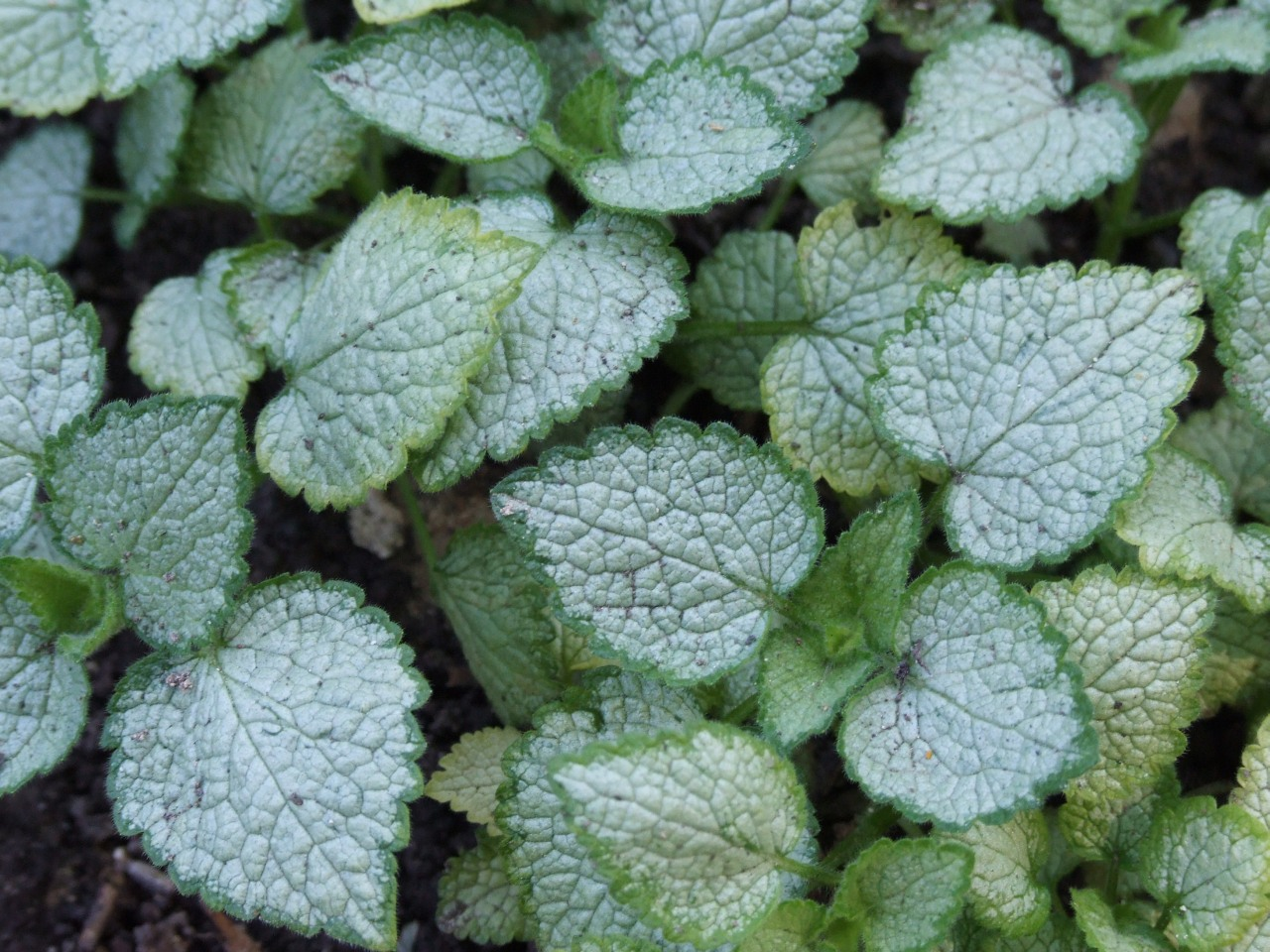
'White Nancy'

== Synonyms ==
- Lamium affine Guss. & Ten. in M.Tenore
- Lamium album var. maculatum L.
- Lamium cardiaca Cogn.
- Lamium columnae Ten.
- Lamium cupreum Schott
- Lamium cupreum subsp. dilatatum (Schur) Nyman
- Lamium dilatatum Schur
- Lamium elegantissimum Schur
- Lamium foliosum Crantz
- Lamium grandiflorum Willd. ex Benth.
- Lamium grenieri Mutel
- Lamium gundelsheimeri K.Koch
- Lamium hirsutum Lam.
- Lamium laevigatum L.
- Lamium melissifolium Mill.
- Lamium mutabile Dumort.
- Lamium niveum Schrad.
- Lamium pallidiflorum Beck
- Lamium rubrum Jenk.
- Lamium rugosum Sol. in W.Aiton
- Lamium stoloniferum Lapeyr.
- Lamium tillii Ten.
- Lamium truncatum Boiss.
- Lamium villosifolium (R.R.Mill) A.P.Khokhr.
- Lamium vulgatum var. rubrum Benth.
