= Lamenallenic acid =

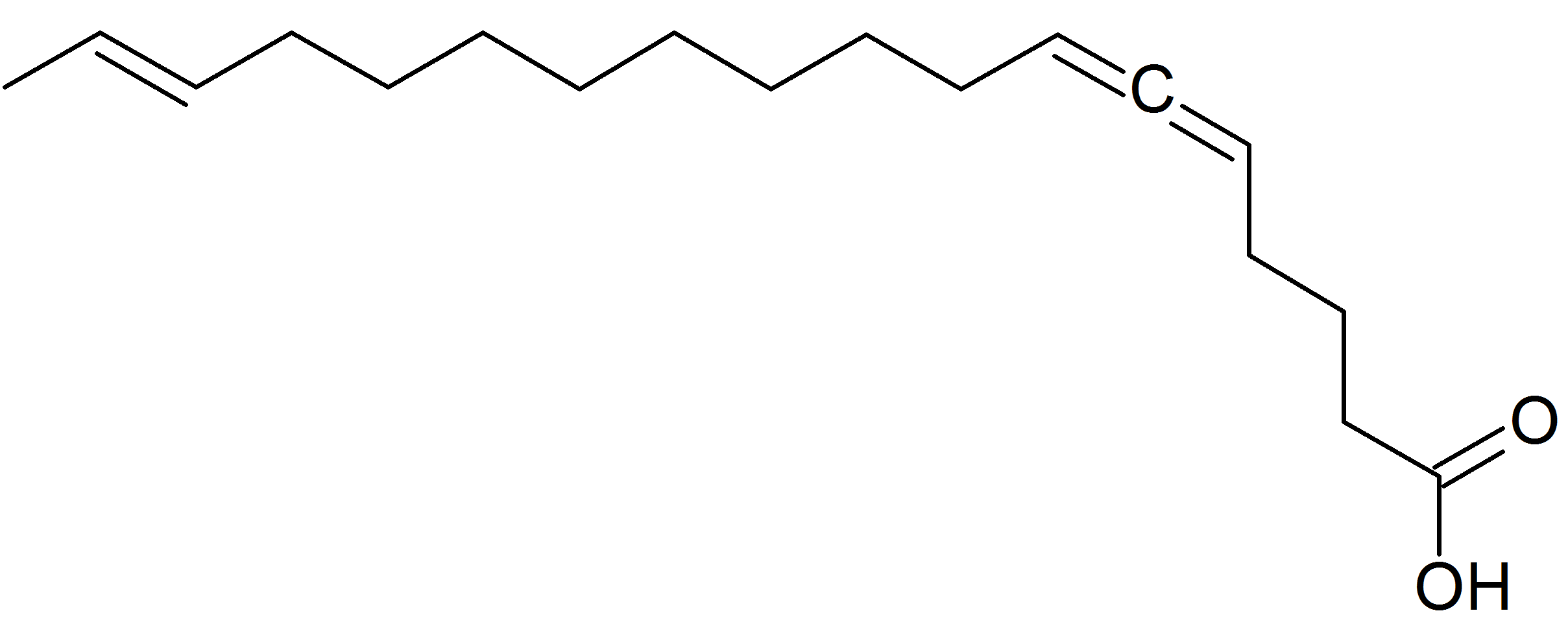

Names
- Other names (E)-5,6,16-octadecatrienoic acid

Identifiers
3D model (JSmol)	Interactive image
ChEBI	CHEBI:38396
ChemSpider	4471916
PubChem CID	5312491
- InChI: InChI=1S/C18H30O2/c1-2-3-4-5-6-7-8-9-10-11-12-13-14-15-16-17-18(19)20/h2-3,12,14H,4-11,15-17H2,1H3,(H,19,20)/b3-2+ Key: IHBRXZJPXHXMCN-NSCUHMNNSA-N
- SMILES: C/C=C/CCCCCCCCC=C=CCCCC(=O)O

Properties
Chemical formula	C_{18}H_{30}O_{2}
Molar mass	278.436 g·mol^{−1}
- Except where otherwise noted, data are given for materials in their standard state (at 25 °C [77 °F], 100 kPa). Infobox references

Lamenallenic acid is a linear octadecatrienic fatty acid with the structural formula CH_{3}CH=CH(CH_{2})_{8}CH=C=CH(CH_{2})_{3}COOH. The delta notation is 18:3-delta-5,6allene,16t. This is one of the rare allenic fatty acids found in nature, probably biosynthesized from laballenic acid.

== Physical properties ==
Some authors have attributed the cis-configuration to the double bond in the position 16=17.

The allene group is responsible for the marked optical activity of the acid. Lamenallenic acid is levorotatory with (R)-configuration.

== Discovery ==
The acid was initially isolated in 1967 by Mikolajczak, Rogers, Smith, and Wolff in the seed oil of Lamium purpureum (10-16%), a plant of the Lamiaceae family. The compound is also found in the seed oil of other Lamiaceae: Lamium maculatum (~8%), Lamium album (~5%), Lamium amplexicaule (~5%).

== Synthesis ==
The acid can be obtained by a highly enantioselective synthesis, utilizing the recently developed EATA (enantioselective allenylation of terminal alkynes) reaction and aerobic oxidation reaction.
