= Hydroxyestradiol =

Hydroxyestradiol means the hydroxylation products of estradiol and its analogues, may refer to:

== Hydroxyestradiol ==
- 2-Hydroxyestradiol
- 4-Hydroxyestradiol
- 15α-Hydroxyestradiol
- Estriol (16α-hydroxyestradiol)
- Epiestriol (16β-hydroxyestradiol)

== Hydroxyepiestradiol ==
- 17α-Epiestriol (16α-hydroxyepiestradiol)
- 16β,17α-Epiestriol (16β-hydroxyepiestradiol)

== Dihydroxyestradiol ==
- Estetrol (15α,16α-dihydroxyestradiol)
- 2-Hydroxyestriol
- 4-Hydroxyestriol
