= Isanolic acid =

Names
- IUPAC name 8-hydroxyoctadec-17-en-9,11-diynoic acid
- Other names 8-OH-18:3-delta-9a,11a,17

Identifiers
CAS Number	64144-78-1
3D model (JSmol)	Interactive image
ChEBI	CHEBI:173157
ChemSpider	4472265
PubChem CID	5312840
CompTox Dashboard (EPA)	DTXSID30415608
- InChI: InChI=1S/C18H26O3/c1-2-3-4-5-6-7-8-11-14-17(19)15-12-9-10-13-16-18(20)21/h2,17,19H,1,3-6,9-10,12-13,15-16H2,(H,20,21) Key: KWLVIGJGNBJKPA-UHFFFAOYSA-N
- SMILES: OC(CCCCCCC(=O)O)C#CC#CCCCCC=C

Properties
Chemical formula	C_{18}H_{26}O_{3}
Molar mass	290.403 g·mol^{−1}
Appearance	liquid
- Except where otherwise noted, data are given for materials in their standard state (at 25 °C [77 °F], 100 kPa). Infobox references

Isanolic acid is a linear fatty acid composed of 18 carbon atoms, with two triple bonds in the positions 9≡10 and 11≡12, a double bond in the position 17=18, and a hydroxyl-OH in the position 8. The acid is one of the rare polyacetylenic acids with conjugated triple bonds. The compound belongs to the family of diynes and enynes, as well as to the alkyne and alkenoic acids.

The related compounds are isanic and ketoisanic acids, both containing only one hydroxyl group.

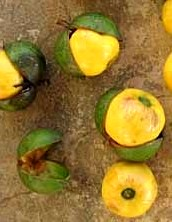
Seeds of Ongokea gore contain the acid

== Discovery ==
The acid was initially isolated in 1937 by researchers A. Steger and J. van Loon from the seed oilof the tree Ongokea gore or Ongokea klaineana, a plant from equatorial Africa, called in the native language "boleka" or "isano"; a common name of isanolic acid comes from the latter. They also discovered isanic acid. The oil seeds contain about 60% lipids. Since the compound is hard to isolate, various analyses have revealed non-homogeneous data on the concentration of isanolic acid in isano oil: from 3% to 44% of the total fatty acids.

== Chemical properties ==
The compound can be detected in isane oil together with other hydroxylated acetylenic fatty acids, all with the hydroxyl in position 8.

The high degree of unsaturation suggests that oils with a high content of these conjugated acetylenic fatty acids are drying; the presence of hydroxylated fatty acids implies the possibility of forming atypical glycerides, such as triglycerides containing more than three acyl groups.

Depending on the reaction conditions, isanolic acid reacts with phenol to form enol ethers or vinyl aromatics.
