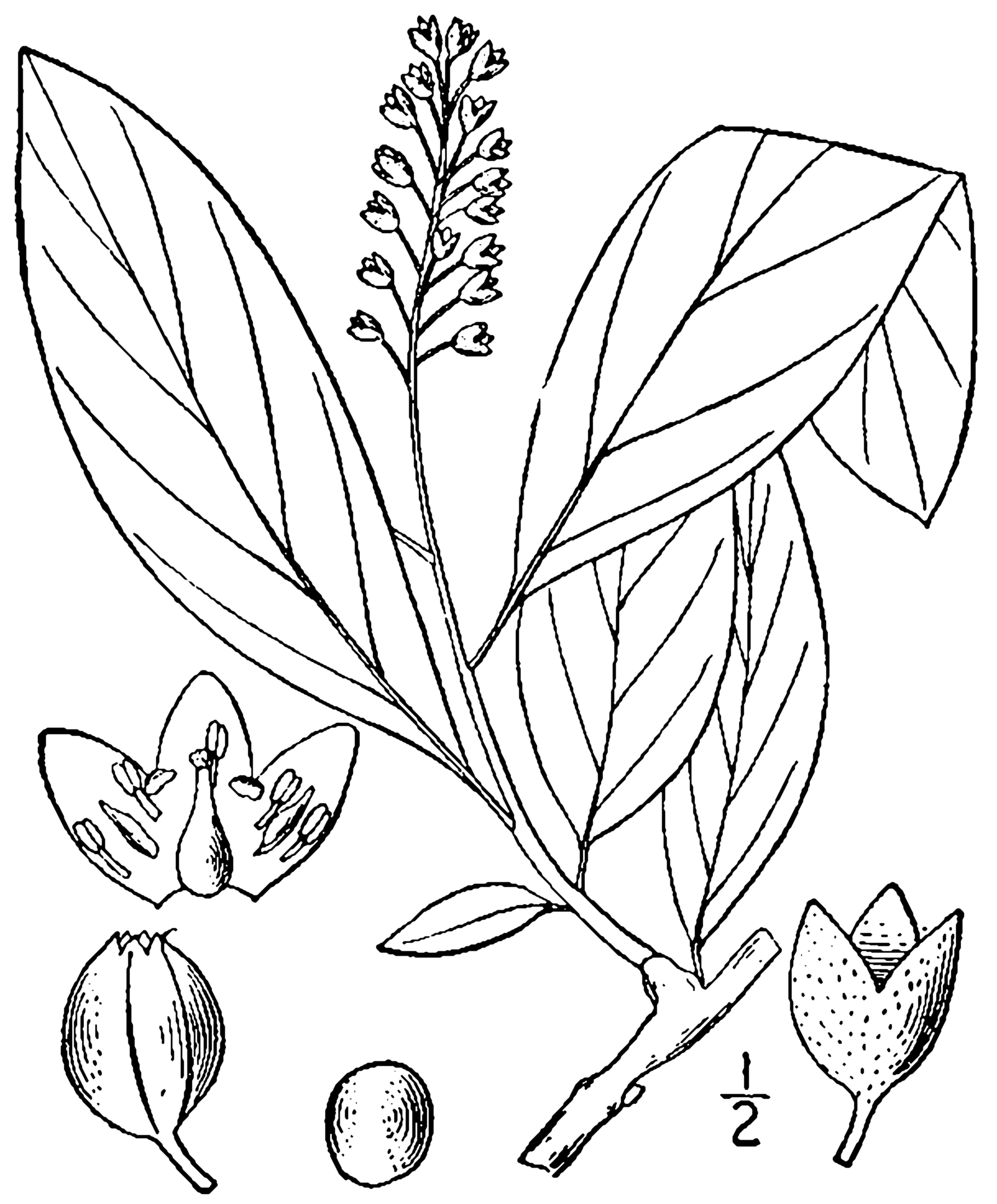
- Pyrularia pubera

Scientific classification
- Kingdom: Plantae
- Clade: Tracheophytes
- Clade: Angiosperms
- Clade: Eudicots
- Order: Santalales
- Family: Santalaceae
- Genus: Pyrularia; Michx.

Synonyms
- Calinux Raf.; Calynux Raf.; Sphaerocarya Wall.

= Pyrularia =

Genus of plants

Pyrularia is a small genus of shrubs or small trees in the sandalwood family (Santalaceae) which contains two species, Pyrularia pubera and Pyrularia edulis. P. pubera grows in the eastern United States and P. edulis grows in Bhutan, China, India, Myanmar, and Nepal. Both species are parasitic plants, specifically hemiparasites, which while still photosynthetic, will also parasitize the roots of other plants around them.

== Taxonomy ==
The genus was first formally named in 1803 by French botanist André Michaux. The name Pyrularia derives from the Latin pyrus meaning "pear" and aria meaning "connecting" — this relates to the shape of the fruit.
