= Enyne =

Any organic compound containing a C=C and C≡C bond

The structure of a conjugated enyne

An enyne is an organic compound containing a C=C double bond (alkene) and a C≡C triple bond (alkyne). It is called a conjugated enyne when the double and triple bonds are conjugated.

The term is a portmanteau of the terms alkene and alkyne.

The simplest enyne is vinylacetylene.

Some examples of enynes found in nature are isanolic acid, exocarpic acid and cicutoxin.

== See also ==
- Enyne metathesis
- Enediyne
- Polyyne
