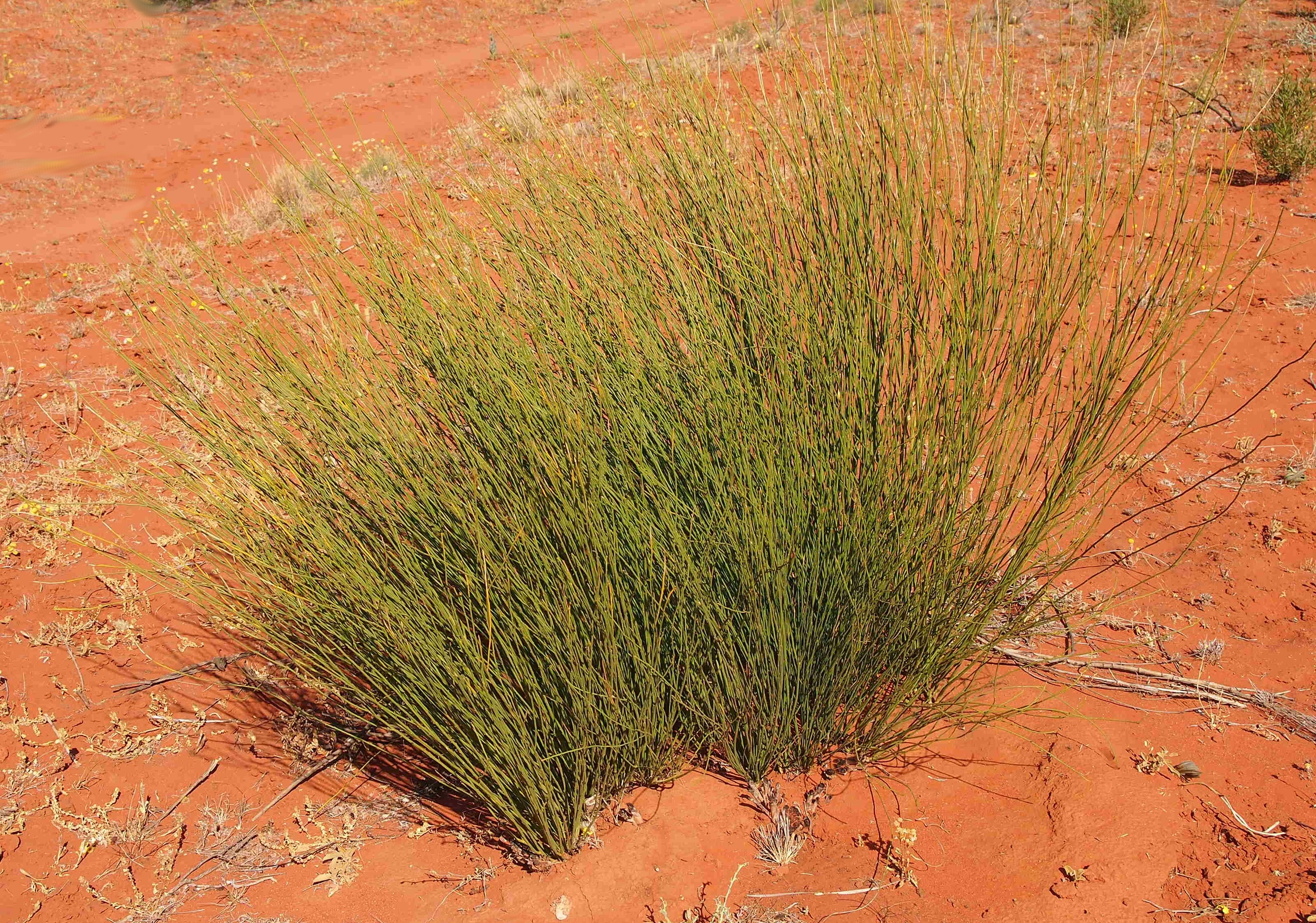

Scientific classification
- Kingdom: Plantae
- Clade: Tracheophytes
- Clade: Angiosperms
- Clade: Eudicots
- Order: Santalales
- Family: Santalaceae
- Genus: Exocarpos
- Species: E. sparteus

Binomial name
- Exocarpos sparteus R.Br.
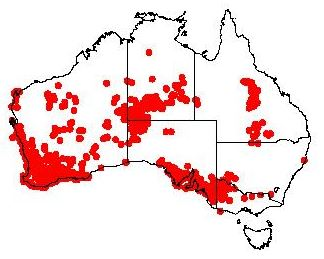
- Occurrence data from AVH

= Exocarpos sparteus =

Species of plant

Exocarpos sparteus is an Australian endemic plant species, commonly known as the broom ballart, slender cherry, or native cherry. The species is found in all states of mainland Australia.

== Description ==
A shrub, four metres tall, erect, with drooping branchlets, almost leafless. The species bears flowering branchlets, which may have small, greenish-yellow, and stalkless leaves. The flowers are just 1 mm across and of a similar colour, occasionally white. The fruit of this species is egg-shaped, pink or red, and between 4 and 5 mm long.

The habit of this plant is upright, becoming slightly curved, combining with the many regular branches to form a rounded aspect. The smooth and spherical appearance of the species is given by the droop of the branchlets, the similar colour and size of the leaves and flowers, and upcurving of the outward branches.

== Naming ==
The specific name is derived from the Latin word esparto, referring to a kind of Spanish grass that was used for its fibre. It was first described by Robert Brown, in 1810, having collected the plants on his visit to King George Sound in 1802. One of the species' common names, native cherry, is given to another congener with an edible fruit, Exocarpos cupressiformis; both of these species are known as sorts of Ballart. The Noongar peoples know the plant as Chukk, Dtulya or Merrin.

== Ecology ==
The fruit of E. sparteus is eaten by Australian ringnecks (Barnardius zonarius) and, presumably, other birds. It is also thought to be the Exocarpos species eaten by people in Australia, especially prior to colonisation. The species is a hemi-parasite, gaining nutrients from other plant's roots, a process undertaken by many in the Santalaceae family.

== See also ==
- Exocarpic acid, a rare fatty acid found in the plant.
