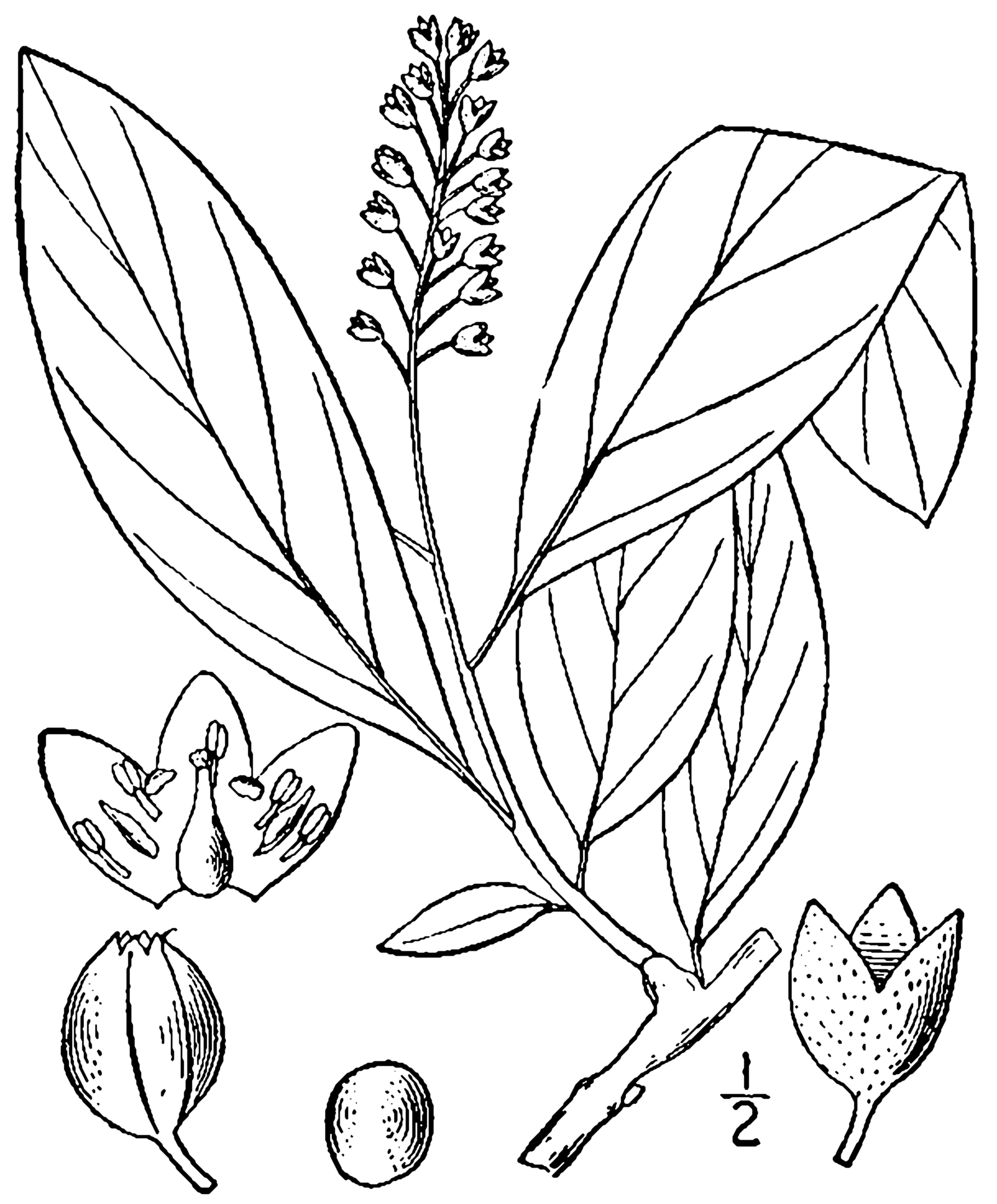

Scientific classification
- Kingdom: Plantae
- Clade: Tracheophytes
- Clade: Angiosperms
- Clade: Eudicots
- Order: Santalales
- Family: Santalaceae
- Genus: Pyrularia
- Species: P. pubera

Binomial name
- Pyrularia pubera Michx.

= Pyrularia pubera =

Species of plant

Pyrularia pubera is a shrub in the sandalwood family which grows through the eastern United States from New York to Alabama, being mostly found in the Appalachian Mountains. It is commonly referred to as buffalo nut or oil nut. It grows up to 4 meters (13 ft) tall mostly in the shade of other trees. It is a parasitic plant, specifically a hemiparasite which while still photosynthetic, will also parasitize the roots of other plants around it. It can parasitize many hosts.
