= 10β,17β-Dihydroxyestra-1,4-dien-3-one =

Chemical compound

Clinical data
- Other names: DHED; Estradiol paraquinol; Estra-1,4-diene-10β,17β-diol-3-one
- Routes of administration: By mouth
- Drug class: Estrogen

Identifiers
- IUPAC name: (8S,9S,10S,13S,14S,17S)-10,17-dihydroxy-13-methyl-6,7,8,9,11,12,14,15,16,17-decahydrocyclopenta[a]phenanthren-3-one
- CAS Number: 549-02-0
- PubChem CID: 11851170
- ChemSpider: 10025642
- UNII: UR9WW8CA3J

Chemical and physical data
- Formula: C_{18}H_{24}O_{3}
- Molar mass: 288.387 g·mol^{−1}
- 3D model (JSmol): Interactive image
- SMILES: C[C@]12CC[C@H]3[C@H]([C@@H]1CC[C@@H]2O)CCC4=CC(=O)C=C[C@]34O
- InChI: InChI=1S/C18H24O3/c1-17-8-7-15-13(14(17)4-5-16(17)20)3-2-11-10-12(19)6-9-18(11,15)21/h6,9-10,13-16,20-21H,2-5,7-8H2,1H3/t13-,14-,15-,16-,17-,18+/m0/s1; Key:UIKDFTLKOKNUJP-UGDFAFBOSA-N

10β,17β-Dihydroxyestra-1,4-dien-3-one (DHED), also known as estradiol paraquinol, is an orally active, centrally selective estrogen and a biosynthetic prodrug of estradiol.

Upon systemic administration, regardless of route of administration, DHED has been found to rapidly and selectively convert into estradiol in the brain, whereas no such conversion occurs in the rest of the body. Moreover, DHED itself possesses no estrogenic activity, requiring transformation into estradiol for its estrogenicity. As such, the drug shows selective estrogenic effects in the brain (e.g., alleviation of hot flashes, neuroprotection) that are said to be identical to those of estradiol, whereas estrogenic effects elsewhere in the body are not observed.

DHED has been proposed as a possible novel estrogenic treatment for neurological and psychiatric conditions associated with hypoestrogenism (e.g., menopausal hot flashes, depression, cognitive decline, Alzheimer's disease, and stroke) that uniquely lacks potentially detrimental estrogenic side effects in the periphery.
