= Ketoisanic acid =

Names
- IUPAC name 8-oxooctadec-17-en-9,11-diynoic acid
- Other names 8-O=18:3Δ9a,11a,17

Identifiers
CAS Number	64144-74-7
3D model (JSmol)	Interactive image
ChEBI	CHEBI:197078
ChemSpider	57514446
PubChem CID	71380416
CompTox Dashboard (EPA)	DTXSID10802931
- InChI: InChI=1S/C18H24O3/c1-2-3-4-5-6-7-8-11-14-17(19)15-12-9-10-13-16-18(20)21/h2H,1,3-6,9-10,12-13,15-16H2,(H,20,21) Key: SSLASXCMMXZERF-UHFFFAOYSA-N
- SMILES: C=CCCCCC#CC#CC(=O)CCCCCCC(=O)O

Properties
Chemical formula	C_{18}H_{24}O_{3}
Molar mass	288.387 g·mol^{−1}
- Except where otherwise noted, data are given for materials in their standard state (at 25 °C [77 °F], 100 kPa). Infobox references

Ketoisanic acid is a linear fatty acid composed of 18 carbon atoms, with two triple bonds in the positions 9≡10 and 11≡12, a double bond in the position 17=18, and a ketone substituent in the position 8. This is one of the rare polyacetylenic acids with conjugated triple bonds, the oxygenated isanic acid.

== Natural occurrence ==
The acid can be detected, at concentrations of 1–3%, together with isanic and isanolic acid, in the seed oil of the tree Ongokea gore or Ongokea klaineana; both are plants from equatorial Africa, called "isano" in the local language.
