= Phlomic acid =

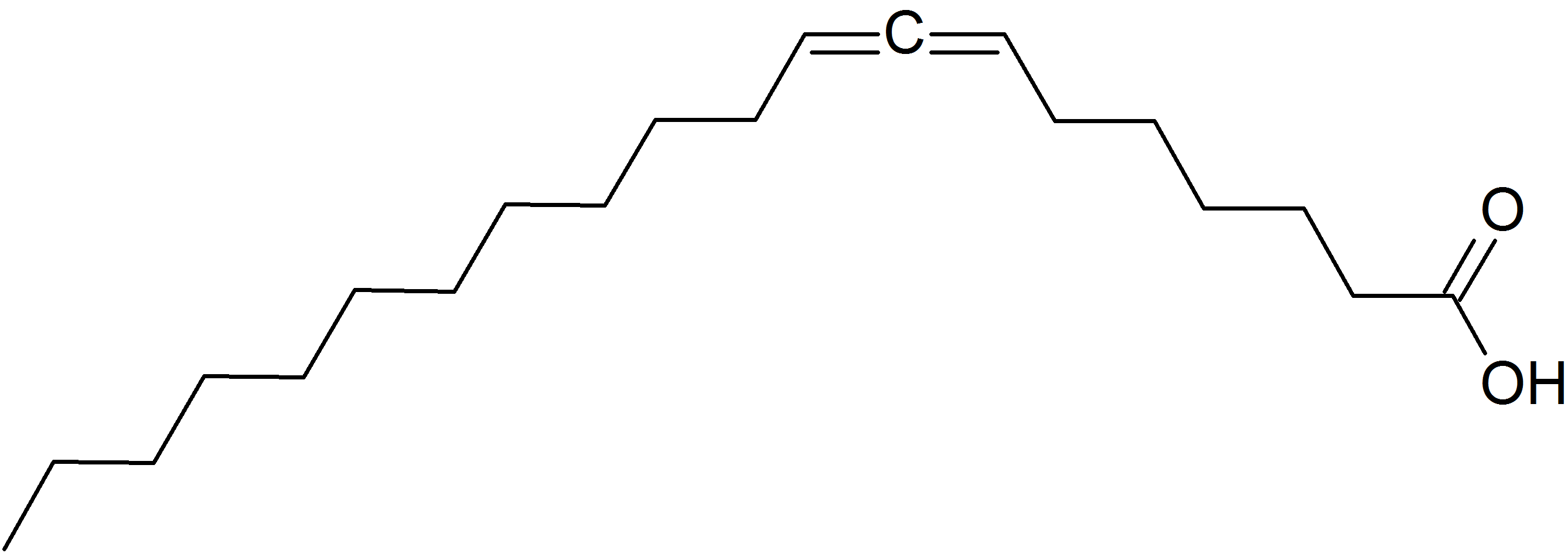

Names
- Other names Eicosa-7,8-dienoic acid

Identifiers
3D model (JSmol)	Interactive image
ChemSpider	74837261
PubChem CID	102066359
- InChI: InChI=1S/C20H36O2/c1-2-3-4-5-6-7-8-9-10-11-12-13-14-15-16-17-18-19-20(21)22/h12,14H,2-11,15-19H2,1H3,(H,21,22) Key: IDIFLXHHWAEGTC-UHFFFAOYSA-N
- SMILES: CCCCCCCCCCCC=C=CCCCCCC(=O)O

Properties
Chemical formula	C_{20}H_{36}O_{2}
Molar mass	308.506 g·mol^{−1}
- Except where otherwise noted, data are given for materials in their standard state (at 25 °C [77 °F], 100 kPa). Infobox references

Phlomic acid is an unsaturated fatty acid with an allene group, which gives it axial chirality and makes it optically active. Phlomic is related to laballenic acid but has a shorter chain length.

Phlomic acid is composed of 20 carbon atoms, with two consecutive double bonds (allene) in the position 7=8=9. The acid has the structural formula CH_{3}-(CH_{2})_{10}-CH=C=CH-(CH_{2})_{5}-COOH. This is one of the rare allenic fatty acids found in nature, probably biosynthesized by elongation of laballenic acid.

== Natural occurrence ==
Phlomisic acid is found in some plant species of the Lamiaceae family. For example, it is present at 2.9% in the seed oil of Phlomoides tuberosa. Other species of the genera Phlomis, such as deadnettle, hedgenettle, and Leonurus also contain the compound. Out many species of the genus Leucas examined, 11 species contained small amounts of phlomisic acid. Only in two species was the content above 1%, and the highest measured content was 1.86%.

== Synthesis ==
Starting from hex-5-yn-1-ol, phlomic acid can be synthesized by a copper(II) bromide-catalyzed reaction with (S)-dimethylprolinol as a chiral auxiliary.

== Discovery ==
The common name of the acid comes from the genus Phlomis. Phlomic acid was initially isolated in 1997 by K. Aitzetmüller, N. and K. Tsevegsüren Vosmann in the seed oil of various Lamiaceae. Further analysis have found that phlomic acid almost always occurs in association with laballenic acid and gadoleic acid.

== Uses ==
Plant derivatives with high content of allenic fatty acids have shown cytotoxic, anti-inflammatory, and antiviral activity.
