= Ongokea =

Scientific classification
- Kingdom: Plantae
- Clade: Tracheophytes
- Clade: Angiosperms
- Clade: Eudicots
- Order: Santalales
- Family: Olacaceae
- Genus: Ongokea; Pierre
- Species: O. gore

Binomial name
- Ongokea gore (Hua) Pierre

Synonyms
- Genus synonymy: Schoepfianthus Engl. ex De Wild.; Species synonymy: Aptandra gore Hua; Ongokea kamerunensis Engl.; Ongokea klaineana Pierre; Schoepfianthus zenkeri Engl. ex De Wild.

Genus of flowering plants

Ongokea is a genus of flowering plants, with one species Ongokea gore (Boleko). In the APG IV system, the genus is placed in the family Olacaceae. Other sources place it in the segregate family Aptandraceae.

Its native range is Western Tropical Africa to Angola, and is notable for the seeds of its edible fruits containing an industrially-useful oil that can undergo explosive polymerization reactions at elevated temperatures. This oil is curious for being rich in diacetylenic and hydroxy-diacetylenic fatty acids, primarily isanic and bolekic acid—that is, instead of a typical single-bonded fatty acid backbone, these acids contain multiple (thermally unstable) triple bonds.

== Description ==
Ongokea gore is a medium to large size tree that can reach 40 m tall with a diameter than reach 1.2 m and often has basal root swellings. It has a fairly open crown that is usually in the upper canopy of the forest. The bark is thick, dark brown, grey or black in color, it is commonly smooth but sometimes scaly and generally fissured and lenticellate. The slash is yellowish in color and scented.

The leave are mid shade green in color and the petiole is 6-10 mm long. The leaflets are elliptic to ovate in shape, about 4-8 cm long and 2-5 cm wide with a base that is cuneate to rounded and an apex that is acuminate. The inflorescence is axillary and paniculate, the flowers are green in color. The fruit is sometimes called Isano by locals, it is drupe like, up to 4 cm in diameter and 1 seeded.

== Ecology ==
Oribatid mites is a dominant inhabitant within suspended soil that has accumulated on branches of the Ongokea gore tree in the rain forest of Gabon, other inhabitants include tectocepheus mites.

== Distribution ==
Occurs in West and Central Africa, in evergreen and semi-deciduous forest environments.

== Chemistry ==
Oil obtained from the seeds of Ongokea gore contains the fatty acid group, dia-acetylenic and has isanic, isanolic, ketoisanic, hydroxy acetylenic, and bolekic acids.

== Uses ==
The seed oil and stem bark extracts are sometimes used as part of a purgative decoction.
