= Empenthrin =

Names
- IUPAC name (E)-(RS)-1-Ethynyl-2-methylpent-2-enyl (1RS,3RS;1RS,3SR)-2,2-dimethyl-3-(2-methylprop-1-enyl)cyclopropanecarboxylate
- Other names Vaporthrin

Identifiers
CAS Number	54406-48-3
3D model (JSmol)	Interactive image
ChemSpider	4939400
ECHA InfoCard	100.053.759
KEGG	C18524
PubChem CID	6434488
UNII	K45WEG8WYL
CompTox Dashboard (EPA)	DTXSID2058122
- InChI: InChI=1S/C18H26O2/c1-8-10-13(5)15(9-2)20-17(19)16-14(11-12(3)4)18(16,6)7/h2,10-11,14-16H,8H2,1,3-7H3/b13-10+ Key: YUGWDVYLFSETPE-JLHYYAGUSA-N; InChI=1/C18H26O2/c1-8-10-13(5)15(9-2)20-17(19)16-14(11-12(3)4)18(16,6)7/h2,10-11,14-16H,8H2,1,3-7H3/b13-10+ Key: YUGWDVYLFSETPE-JLHYYAGUBJ
- SMILES: CCC=C(C)C(C#C)OC(=O)C1C(C1(C)C)C=C(C)C

Properties
Chemical formula	C_{18}H_{26}O_{2}
Molar mass	274.404 g·mol^{−1}
- Except where otherwise noted, data are given for materials in their standard state (at 25 °C [77 °F], 100 kPa). verify (what is ?) Infobox references

Empenthrin (also called vaporthrin) is a synthetic pyrethroid used in insecticides. It is active against broad spectrum of flying insects including moths and other pests damaging textile. It has low acute mammalian toxicity (its oral LD_{50} is above 5000 mg/kg in male rats, above 3500 mg/kg in female rats and greater than 3500 mg/kg in mice). It is however very toxic to fish and other aquatic organisms (96-hour LC_{50} in Oncorhynchus mykiss is 1.7 μg/L, 48-hour EC_{50} in Daphnia magna is 20 μg/L).

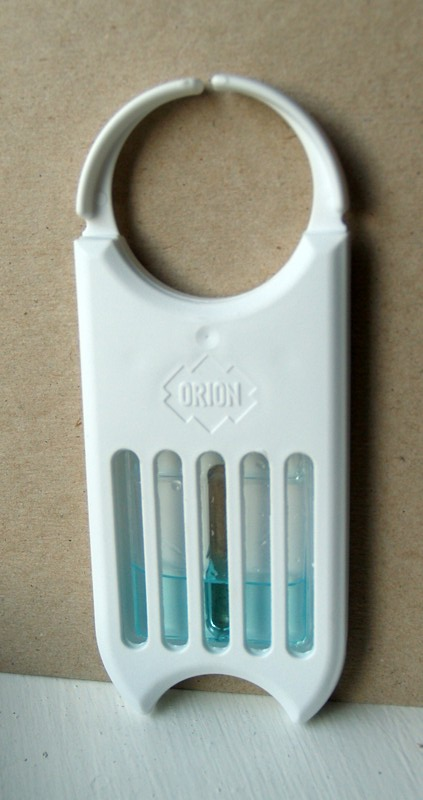
Empenthrin preparation against clothing moths
