= Laballenic acid =

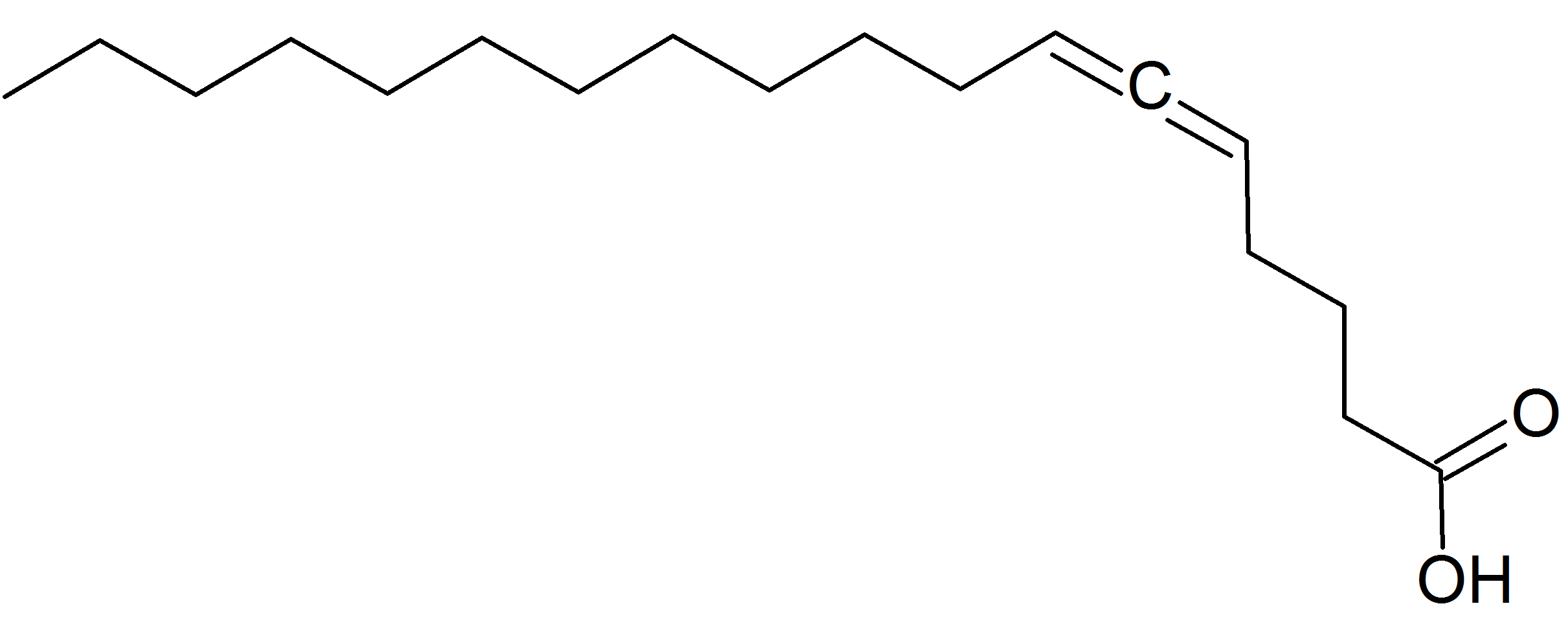

Names
- Other names 5,6-octadecadienoic acid

Identifiers
CAS Number	5204-84-2
3D model (JSmol)	Interactive image
Beilstein Reference	1911935
ChEBI	CHEBI:24993
ChemSpider	4471896
PubChem CID	5312471
- InChI: InChI=1S/C18H32O2/c1-2-3-4-5-6-7-8-9-10-11-12-13-14-15-16-17-18(19)20/h12,14H,2-11,15-17H2,1H3,(H,19,20) Key: YXJXBVWHSBEPDQ-UHFFFAOYSA-N
- SMILES: CCCCCCCCCCCC=C=CCCCC(=O)O

Properties
Chemical formula	C_{18}H_{32}O_{2}
Molar mass	280.452 g·mol^{−1}
- Except where otherwise noted, data are given for materials in their standard state (at 25 °C [77 °F], 100 kPa). Infobox references

Laballenic acid is a linear fatty acid composed of 18 carbon atoms, with two consecutive double bonds (allene) in position 5=6=7. It has the structural formula CH_{3}(CH_{2})_{10}−CH=C=CH−(CH_{2})_{3}COOH.

The acid is one of the rare allenic fatty acids found in nature.

== Discovery ==
The acid was initially isolated in 1964 from the seed oil of Leonotis nepetifolia, a plant of the family Lamiaceae by M.O. Bagby, C.R. Smith Jr., and I.A. Wolff, and identified by the same authors a year later.

Laballenic acid has also been found in Phlomoides tuberosa.

== Synthesis ==
Several methods of synthesis have been published. An efficient and enantioselective synthesis dates back to the year 2022. A further enantioselective synthesis is based on copper(II) bromide catalysis and the use of diphenylprolinol as a chiral auxiliary.

It has also been reported that lamenallenic acid is probably biosynthesized from laballenic acid.

== Physical properties ==
Laballenic acid has axial chirality and is therefore optically active. The absolute configuration of laballenic acid was determined by stereoselective synthesis.

There exist two configurations: the (R)-form and the (S)-form of laballenic acid. The naturally occurring acid has the R-configuration: it is an isomer of linoleic acid related with the similar phlomic acid.

== Use ==
Plant derivatives with high content of allenic fatty acids have shown cytotoxic, anti-inflammatory, and antiviral activity.
