= Exocarpic acid =

Names
- IUPAC name (E)-octadec-13-en-9,11-diynoic acid
- Other names Octadeca-trans-13-ene-9,11-diynoic acid

Identifiers
CAS Number	13089-73-1
3D model (JSmol)	Interactive image
ChEBI	CHEBI:191240
ChEMBL	ChEMBL2204412
ChemSpider	4472109
PubChem CID	5312684
- InChI: InChI=1/C18H26O2/c1-2-3-4-5-6-7-8-9-10-11-12-13-14-15-16-17-18(19)20/h5-6H,2-4,11-17H2,1H3,(H,19,20)/b6-5+/f/h19H Key: ACHMRCSARDWYGC-AATRIKPKSA-N
- SMILES: C(CCCCCCCC#CC#C\C=C\CCCC)(=O)O

Properties
Chemical formula	C_{18}H_{26}O_{2}
Molar mass	274.404 g·mol^{−1}
- Except where otherwise noted, data are given for materials in their standard state (at 25 °C [77 °F], 100 kPa). Infobox references

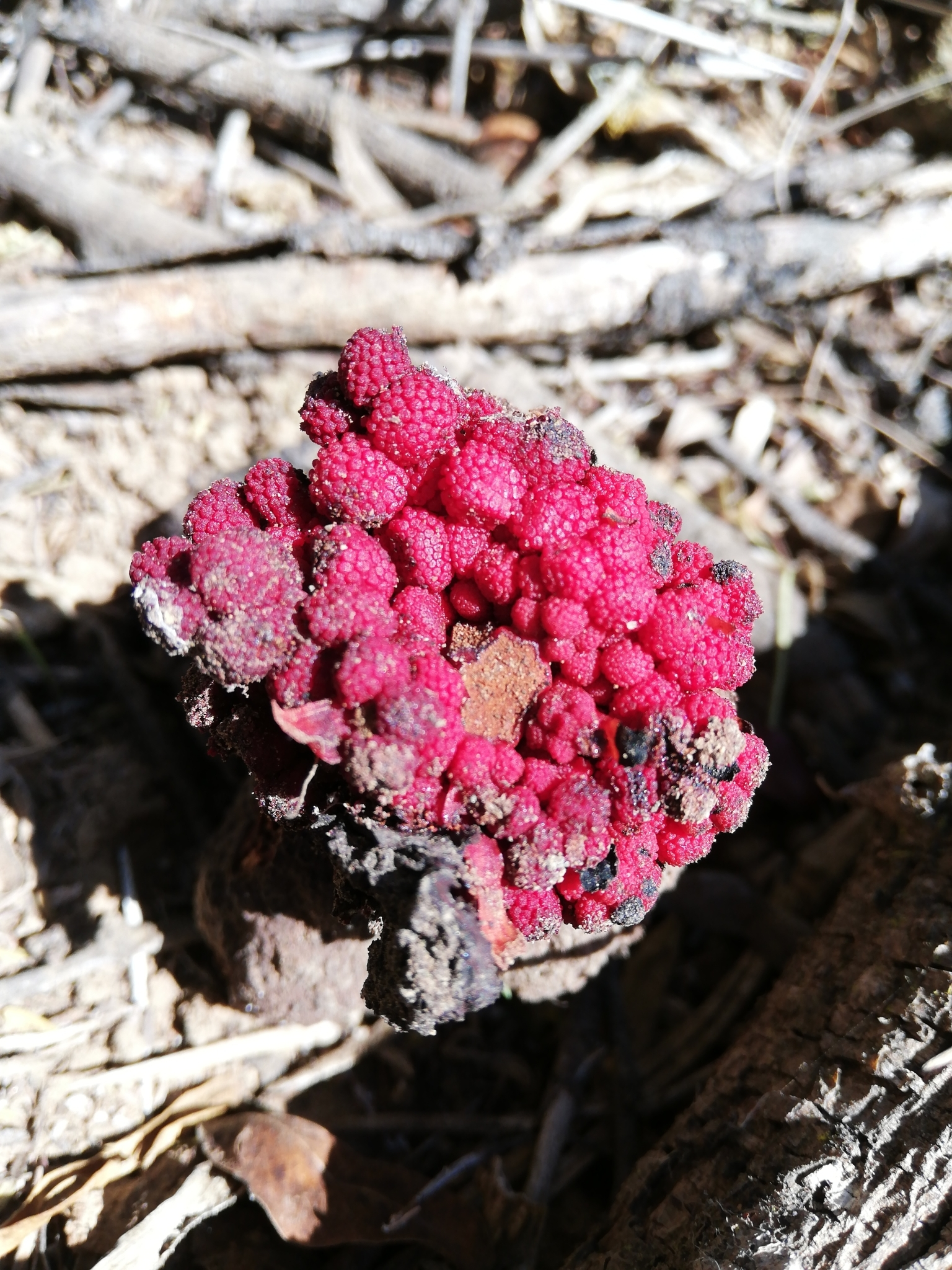
Sarcophyte sanguinea contains free exocarpic acid

Exocarpic acid is an unsaturated, conjugated fatty acid with one double bond and two triple bonds. It is isomeric to isanic acid and belongs to the class of alkyne and alkenoic acids, as well as the diynes and enynes. The acid's delta notation is 18:3-Δ-9a,11a,13t. Its structural formula is CH_{3}(CH_{2})_{3}−CH=CH−C≡CC≡C−(CH_{2})_{7}−COOH.

The acid was initially isolated in 1959, by H. H. Hatt and co-workers, from the roots of the Australian tree Exocarpos cupressiformis; from this genus they derived the common name of exocarpic acid.

== Natural occurrence ==
Exocarpic acid is found in various plant species of the order Santalales.

In the family Olacaceae, it occurs, among others, in the seed oils of Curupira tefeensis and Olax dissitiflora. In the family Santalaceae, it occurs in several species of the genus Thesium, such as mountain flax and Thesium chinense, as well as in several species of the genus Buckleya, such as Buckleya lanceolata and Exocarpos sparteus. It also occurs in small amounts in the isano oil from Ongokea gore.

The parasitic plant Sarcophyte sanguinea from the family Balanophoraceae contains free (not present in the form of glycerides) exocarpic acid.

== Characteristics ==
Exocarpic acid exerts antibacterial activity against Mycobacterium tuberculosis by inhibiting the biosynthesis of mycolic acids. The acid also exerts antibacterial activity against several bacteria that cause oral infections.
