= Isanic acid =

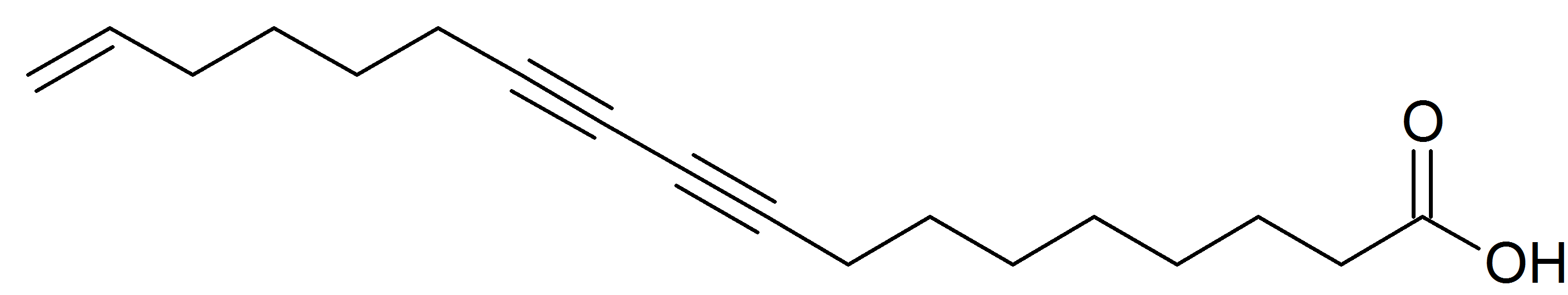

Names
- IUPAC name octadec-17-en-9,11-diynoic acid
- Other names Erythrogenic acid

Identifiers
CAS Number	506-25-2
3D model (JSmol)	Interactive image
ChEBI	CHEBI:197116
ChemSpider	4472111
PubChem CID	5312686
UNII	JEO6512256
CompTox Dashboard (EPA)	DTXSID701304957
- InChI: InChI=1S/C18H26O2/c1-2-3-4-5-6-7-8-9-10-11-12-13-14-15-16-17-18(19)20/h2H,1,3-6,11-17H2,(H,19,20) Key: OASRDXXKKGHDJZ-UHFFFAOYSA-N
- SMILES: OC(=O)CCCCCCCC#CC#CCCCCC=C

Properties
Chemical formula	C_{18}H_{26}O_{2}
Molar mass	274.404 g·mol^{−1}
Appearance	crystalline platelets or prisms, light-sensitive; turns red
- Except where otherwise noted, data are given for materials in their standard state (at 25 °C [77 °F], 100 kPa). Infobox references

Isanic acid or erythrogenic acid is a linear fatty acid composed of 18 carbon atoms, with two triple bonds in the positions 9≡10 and 11≡12 and a double bond in the position 17=18. This is one of the rare polyacetylenic acids with conjugated triple bonds. Its delta notation is 18:3Δ9a,11a,17. Its structural formula is CH_{2}=CH-(CH_{2})_{4}–C≡C–C≡C–(CH_{2})_{7}–COOH.

Exocarpic acid is isomeric to isanic acid. The related isanolic acid, unlike isanic acid, contains an additional hydroxyl group. The oxygenated isanic acid is called ketoisanic acid.

== Discovery ==
Isanic acid was initially isolated in 1937 by researchers A. Steger and J. van Loon in the oil of the seeds of Ongokea gore or Ongokea klaineana, a plant from equatorial Africa, called in the native language "boleka" or "isane", hence the common name of isanic acid. The oil seeds contain about 60% lipids. Various analyses have revealed the concentration of isanic acid in isane oil from 32% to 51%.

== Synthesis ==
The synthesis of isanic acid is possible starting from 10-undecynoic acid.

== Physical properties ==
Isanic acid can be detected together with its isomers with the double bond in position 13=14: boletic acid and exocarpic acid, and hydroxylated fatty acids, such as isanolic acid.

The high degree of unsaturation suggests that oils with a high content of these conjugated acetylenic fatty acids are drying. Isanic acid polymerizes easily, turning a bright red color when exposed to light. Because of this characteristic the alternative name of erythrogenic acid was proposed by Castille in 1940.

Insoluble in ether.
