= Pyrularia edulis =

Scientific classification
- Kingdom: Plantae
- Clade: Tracheophytes
- Clade: Angiosperms
- Clade: Eudicots
- Order: Santalales
- Family: Santalaceae
- Genus: Pyrularia
- Species: P. edulis

Binomial name
- Pyrularia edulis (Wallich) A. Candolle

Species of plant

Pyrularia edulis is a species of shrub or small tree in the sandalwood family. It grows in Bhutan, China, India, Myanmar, and Nepal.
