= 15α-Hydroxyestradiol =

Names
- IUPAC name Estra-1,3,5(10)-triene-3,15α,17β-triol
- Systematic IUPAC name (1S,3S,3aS,3bR,9bS,11aS)-11a-Methyl-2,3,3a,3b,4,5,9b,10,11,11a-decahydro-1H-cyclopenta[a]phenanthrene-1,3,7-triol
- Other names 15α-OH-E2; 15α-Hydroxy-17β-estradiol; 3,15α,17β-Trihydroxyestra-1,3,5(10)-triene

Identifiers
CAS Number	570-30-9
3D model (JSmol)	Interactive image
ChEBI	CHEBI:87593
ChemSpider	59792
PubChem CID	66418
CompTox Dashboard (EPA)	DTXSID00972490
- InChI: InChI=1S/C18H24O3/c1-18-7-6-13-12-5-3-11(19)8-10(12)2-4-14(13)17(18)15(20)9-16(18)21/h3,5,8,13-17,19-21H,2,4,6-7,9H2,1H3/t13-,14-,15+,16+,17-,18-/m1/s1 Key: QVQMPLATUBCZMQ-GVLSGGHMSA-N
- SMILES: C[C@]12CC[C@H]3[C@H]([C@@H]1[C@H](C[C@@H]2O)O)CCC4=C3C=CC(=C4)O

Properties
Chemical formula	C_{18}H_{24}O_{3}
Molar mass	288.387 g·mol^{−1}
- Except where otherwise noted, data are given for materials in their standard state (at 25 °C [77 °F], 100 kPa). Infobox references

15α-Hydroxyestradiol (15α-OH-E2) is an endogenous estrogen which occurs during pregnancy. It is structurally related to estriol (16α-hydroxyestradiol) and estetrol (15α-hydroxyestriol or 15α,16α-dihydroxyestradiol).
