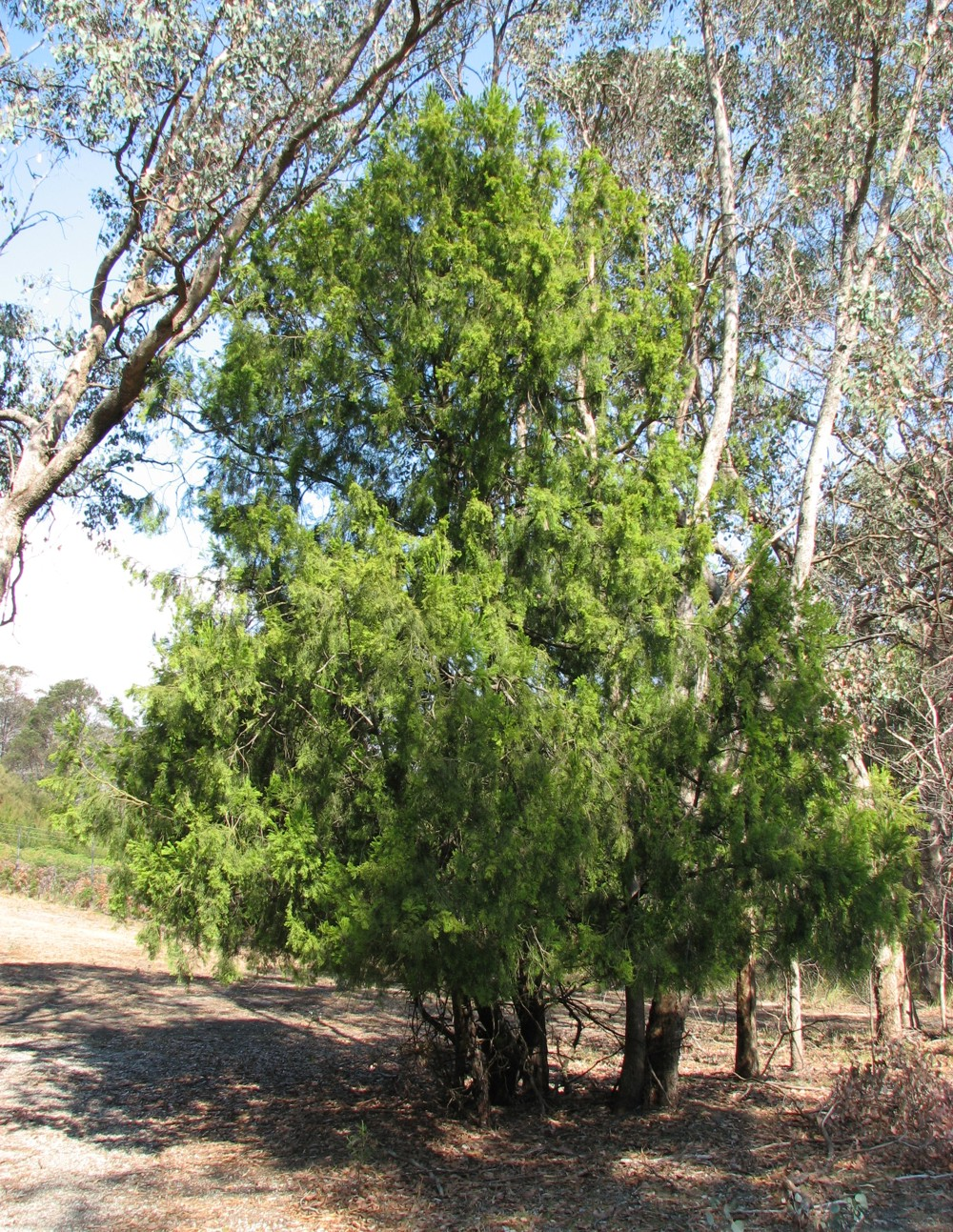

Scientific classification
- Kingdom: Plantae
- Clade: Tracheophytes
- Clade: Angiosperms
- Clade: Eudicots
- Order: Santalales
- Family: Santalaceae
- Genus: Exocarpos
- Species: E. cupressiformis

Binomial name
- Exocarpos cupressiformis Labill.
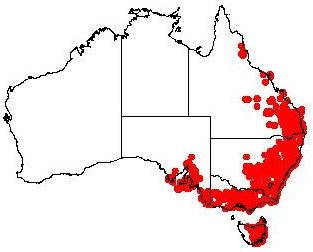
- Occurrence data from AVH

= Exocarpos cupressiformis =

Species of plant

Exocarpos cupressiformis is a tree belonging to the plant family Santalaceae. Its common names include native cherry, cherry ballart, and cypress cherry. It is a species endemic to Australia. Occasionally, the genus is spelled as "Exocarpus". Exocarpic acid, a rare fatty acid, is named after the tree.

== Description ==
The cherry ballart superficially resembles the cypress. It is a large shrub or small tree, 3 to 8 m (9.8 to 26.2 ft) tall, often pyramidal in shape. There are no authoritative published accounts of its host plants or parasitism, with most sources being anecdotal. In the early stages of development, like many members of Santalaceae, E. cupressiformis are hemiparasitic on the roots of other trees, particularly eucalypts. This parasitism thrives in shallow soils. Mature plants are less reliant on this parasitism due to the photosynthetic structures in their stems being better established.

The leaves are reduced to small scales, and the green, drooping stems are the site of photosynthesis. Its inconspicuous flowers are arranged in clusters on short spikes 3–6 mm long. Only one flower on each spike forms a fruit. The inedible fruit is a globular, hard, greenish nut, 4-6mm long, containing one seed. It is found on top of a short pedicel. As the fruit develops, the pedicel swells to 5-6mm in diameter and turns yellow or red, forming the edible "cherry". The fruits lack the hard stones characteristic to the unrelated European cherry. The true, seed-like fruit (actually a nut containing the seed, like the acorn) is found on the outside of the fleshy false "fruit" (actually a swollen pedicel), hence the genus name Exocarpos, from Ancient Greek ἔξω (éxō), meaning "outside", and καρπός (karpós), meaning "fruit", and thus, "outside fruit".

== Habitat ==
E. cupressiformis is found in eastern Australia, in sclerophyll forests, especially in shallow soils, and on granite outcrops. Its habitat range is extensive: from Queensland to Victoria, from the coast to the leeward fringe of the Great Dividing Range, and Tasmania. In more southerly parts of South Australia, plants are found in a number of isolated pockets of forest, including in a band from the Mount Lofty Ranges, down the Fleurieu Peninsula, to Kangaroo Island, in the southern parts of the Yorke Peninsula and the Eyre Peninsula, and in the Mount Remarkable National Park area.

The foliage is anecdotally reported to be toxic to stock, though this is not mentioned in any literature. Browse lines indicate it is readily consumed by herbivores.

== Uses ==
Indigenous Australians used the wood of the plant to make spearthrowers and bull roarers.

The pale wood is very fine-grained with little figure, but often with striking colour variation. The timber was historically used for making furniture, gun-stocks, and tool handles. It is also suitable for carving and turning, so is now used for producing decorative and ornamental pieces of art and craft work.

The fleshy pedicel, the "cherry", is edible, and was used as food by indigenous Australians and by early European settlers. The "fruit" is picked when it is so ripe that it is ready to fall from the tree. It may be eaten raw or cooked.

The 1889 book, The Useful Native Plants of Australia, records that Indigenous Australians in Queensland referred to the plant as Tchimmi-dillen or Coo-yie, and that "The fruit is edible. The nut is seated on the enlarged succulent pedicel. This is the poor little fruit of which so much has been written in English descriptions of the peculiarities of the Australian flora. It has been likened to a cherry with the stone outside (hence the vernacular name) by some imaginative person."

Early European settlers used branches as Christmas trees.

== Dispersal and propagation ==
Birds feed on the "cherries". They are attracted to the colourful pedicel to which the nut is attached. The digestive juices of the bird weaken the hard nut, allowing the internal seed to germinate more easily. Propagation of the species has proved to be difficult.

== Gallery ==
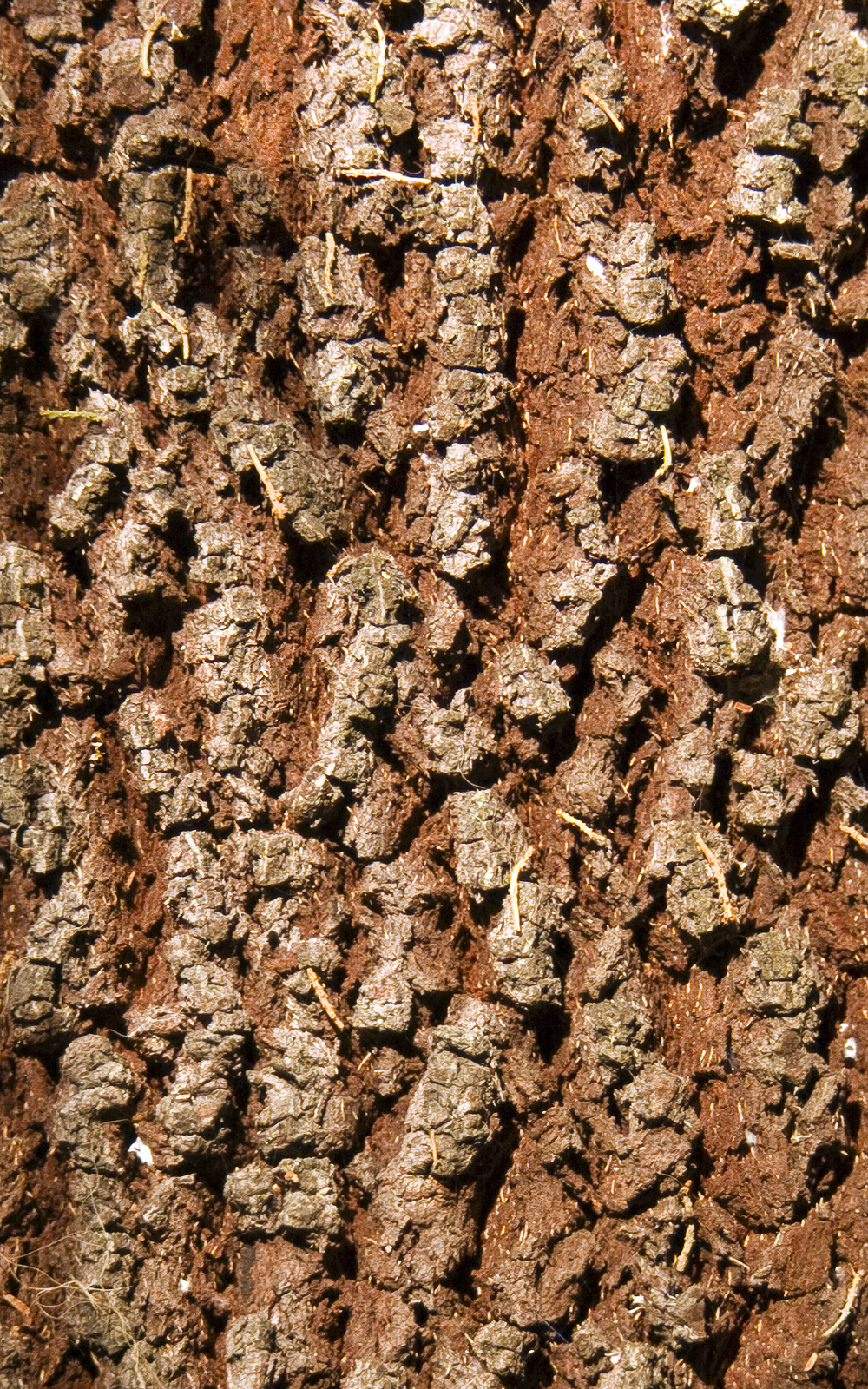
Bark on trunk

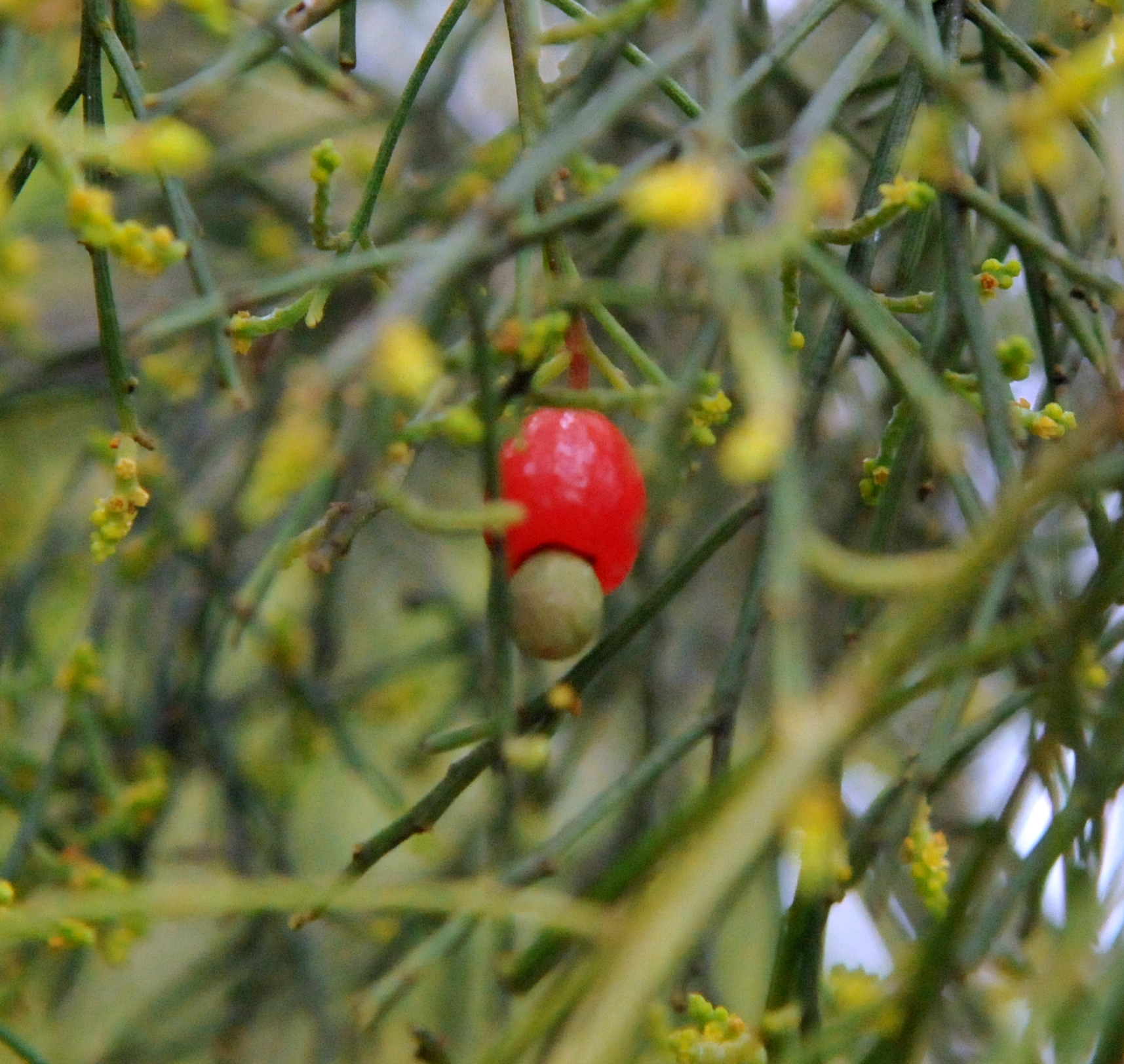
Native Cherry fruit in Bicheno, Tasmania

== See also ==
- Hovenia dulcis
