= Sceloenopla quinquemaculata =

Scientific classification
- Kingdom: Animalia
- Phylum: Arthropoda
- Clade: Pancrustacea
- Class: Insecta
- Order: Coleoptera
- Suborder: Polyphaga
- Infraorder: Cucujiformia
- Family: Chrysomelidae
- Genus: Sceloenopla
- Species: S. quinquemaculata

Binomial name
- Sceloenopla quinquemaculata (Guérin-Méneville, 1844)

Synonyms
- Metazycera quinquemaculata Guérin-Méneville, 1844; Cephalodonta quinquemaculata

Species of beetle

Sceloenopla quinquemaculata is a species of beetle of the family Chrysomelidae. It is found in Colombia and Suriname.

== Description ==
Adults are very similar in form to Sceloenopla tarsata, however the second joint of the antennae is not twice as long as the first, the thorax is rounded behind and narrowed and sinuate in front and the elytra are impressed with large, deep, round punctures, arranged in striae, but the punctures themselves more distantly placed in the rows than in S. tarsata. The striae are confused dentate and on the sides. The alternate interstices are subcostate towards their apex and the posterior angle is armed with a short tooth. The apical margin is obsoletely dentate. There is a patch on the scutellar region and two transverse spots on the disc of each elytron, one before, the other behind the middle, the anterior black.

== Life history ==
No host plant has been documented for this species.
