= Sceloenopla trivittata =

Scientific classification
- Kingdom: Animalia
- Phylum: Arthropoda
- Class: Insecta
- Order: Coleoptera
- Suborder: Polyphaga
- Infraorder: Cucujiformia
- Family: Chrysomelidae
- Genus: Sceloenopla
- Species: S. trivittata

Binomial name
- Sceloenopla trivittata Staines, 2002

Species of beetle

Sceloenopla trivittata is a species of beetle of the family Chrysomelidae. It is found in Costa Rica.

== Description ==
Adults reach a length of about 6.9-8.1 mm. They are yellowish to orangish-red, with the antennae mostly black. The pronotum has black medial longitudinal and lateral margins, while the elytra have the apical one-fourth black.

== Life history ==
No host plant has been documented for this species.

== Etymology ==
The species name is derived from the Latin word tri (meaning three) and vitta (meaning stripe) and refers to the three black vittae on the pronotum.
