= Sceloenopla lugubris =

Scientific classification
- Kingdom: Animalia
- Phylum: Arthropoda
- Clade: Pancrustacea
- Class: Insecta
- Order: Coleoptera
- Suborder: Polyphaga
- Infraorder: Cucujiformia
- Family: Chrysomelidae
- Genus: Sceloenopla
- Species: S. lugubris

Binomial name
- Sceloenopla lugubris (Weise, 1910)

Synonyms
- Cephalodonta (Microdonta) lugubris Weise, 1910; Cephalodonta (Microdonta) lugubris apicipennis Weise, 1910

Species of beetle

Sceloenopla lugubris is a species of beetle of the family Chrysomelidae. It is found in Colombia.

== Life history ==
No host plant has been documented for this species.
