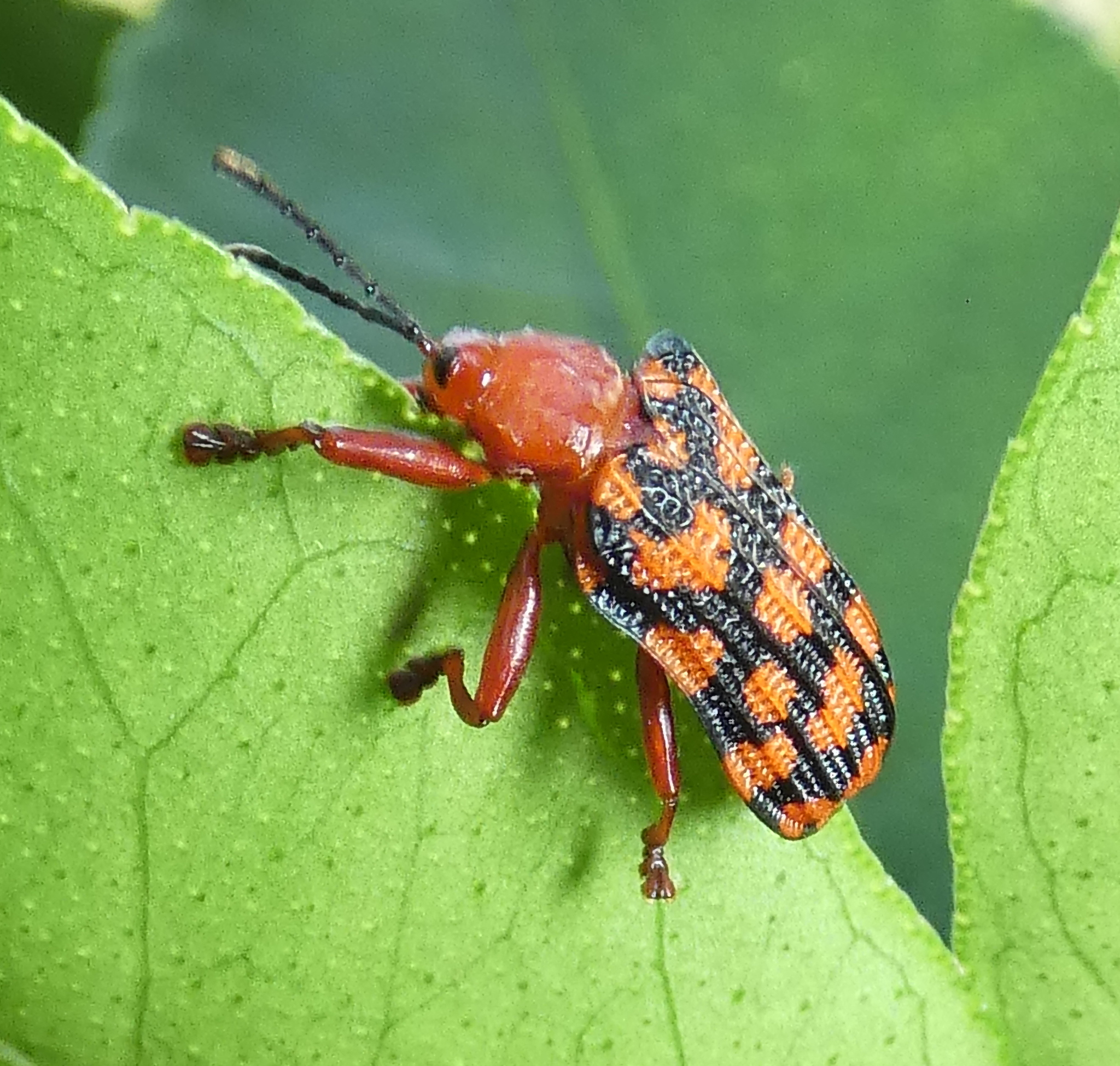
- Sceloenopla maculata, Brazil

Scientific classification
- Kingdom: Animalia
- Phylum: Arthropoda
- Clade: Pancrustacea
- Class: Insecta
- Order: Coleoptera
- Suborder: Polyphaga
- Infraorder: Cucujiformia
- Family: Chrysomelidae
- Subfamily: Cassidinae
- Tribe: Sceloenoplini
- Genus: Sceloenopla; Dejean, 1835

Synonyms
- Cephalodonta Guérin-Méneville, 1844; Microdonta Guérin-Méneville, 1844; Sceloenopla Blanchard, 1846; Chalepotatus (Macrochalepus) Pic, 1929

= Sceloenopla =

Genus of beetles

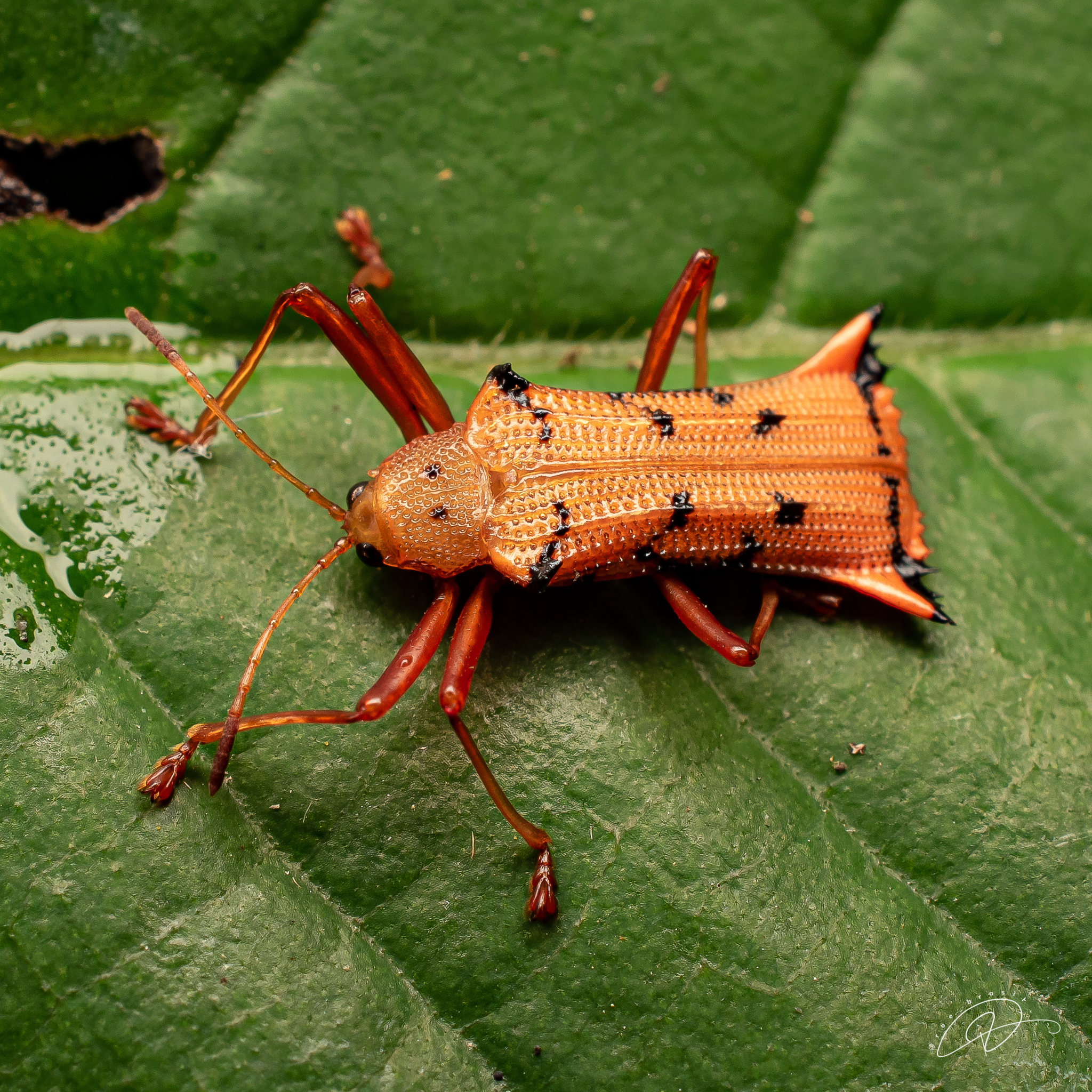
Sceloenopla sparsa, Brazil

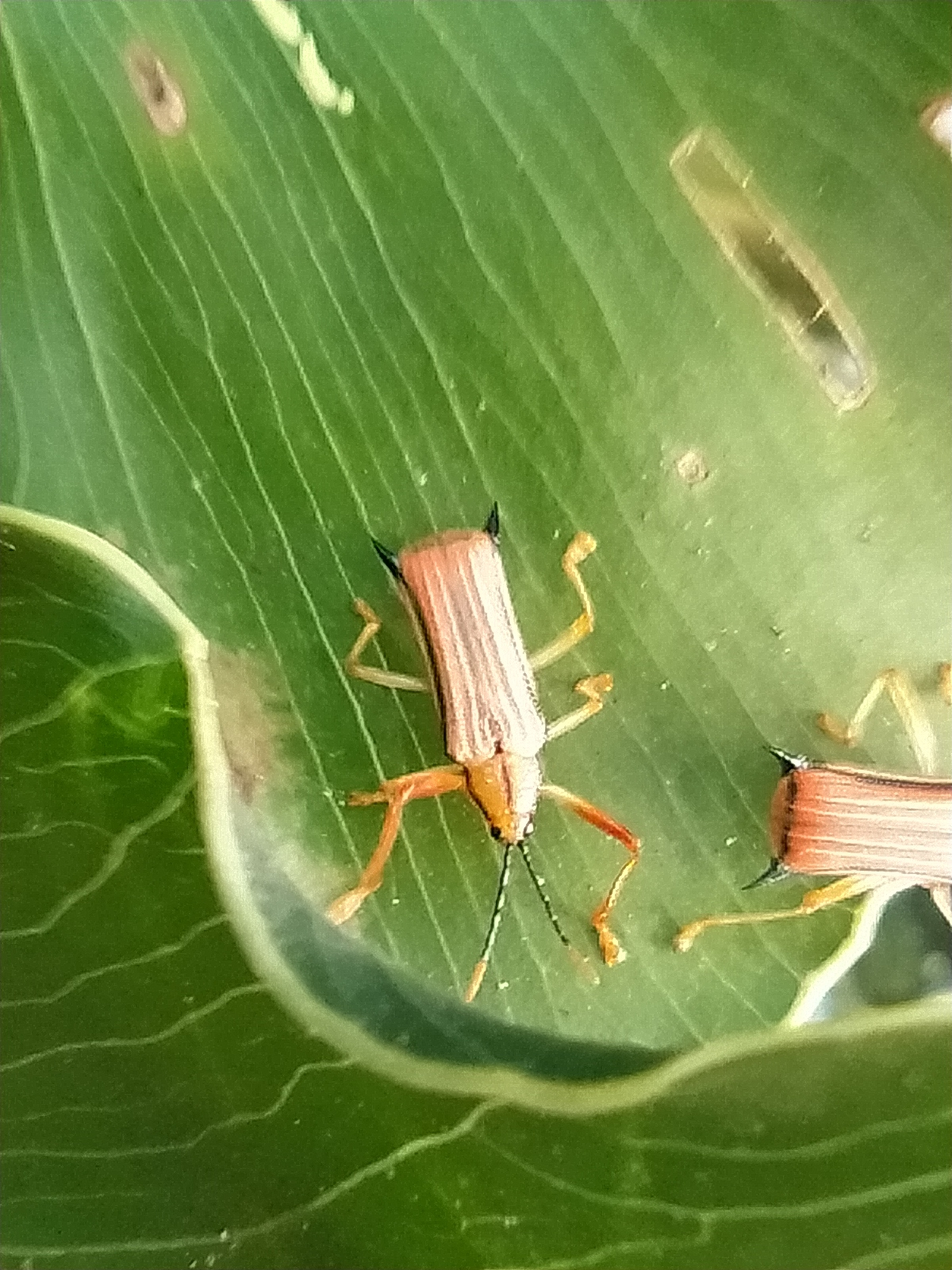
Sceloenopla bidens, Brazil

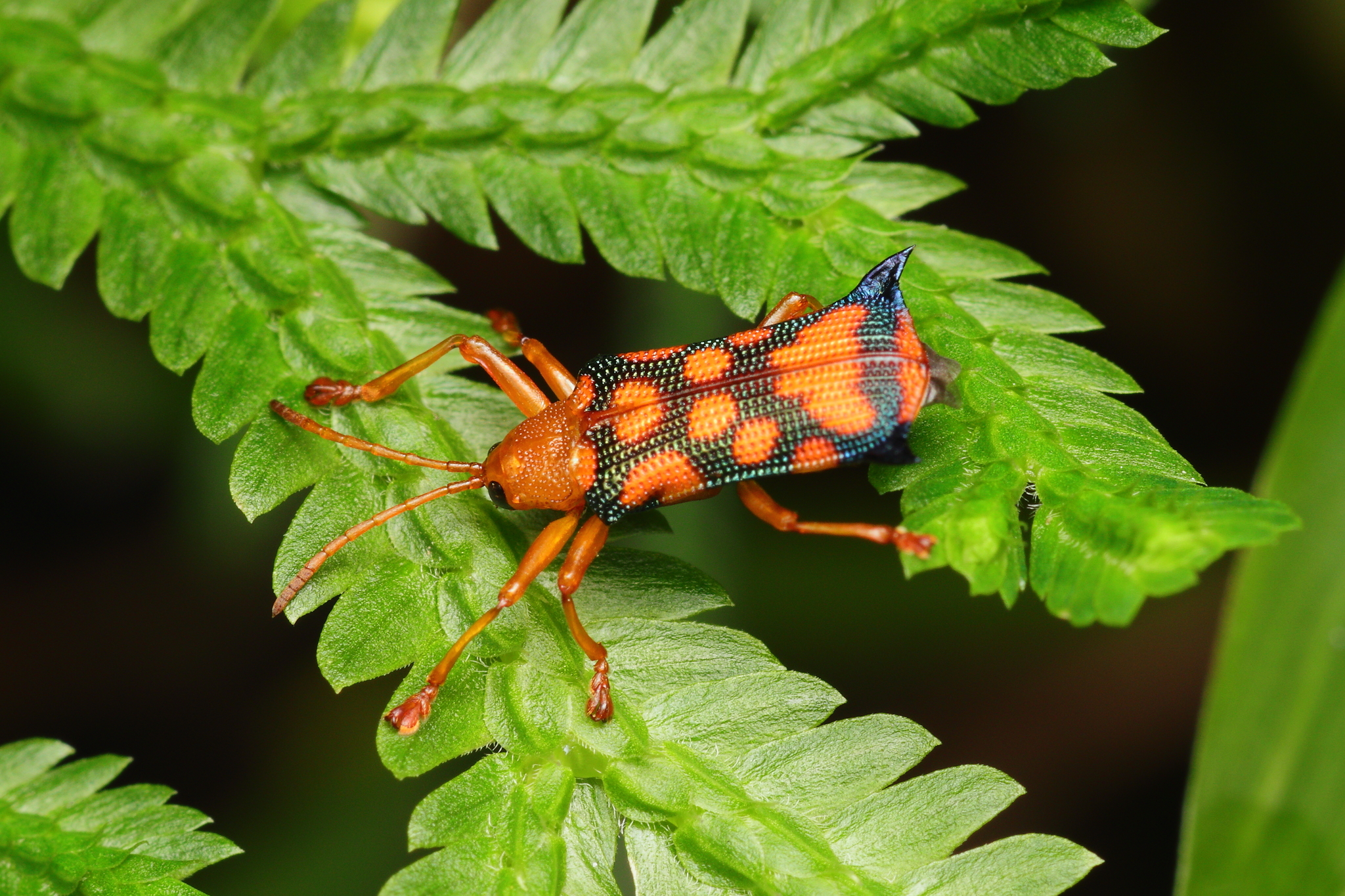
Sceloenopla pulcherrima, Brazil

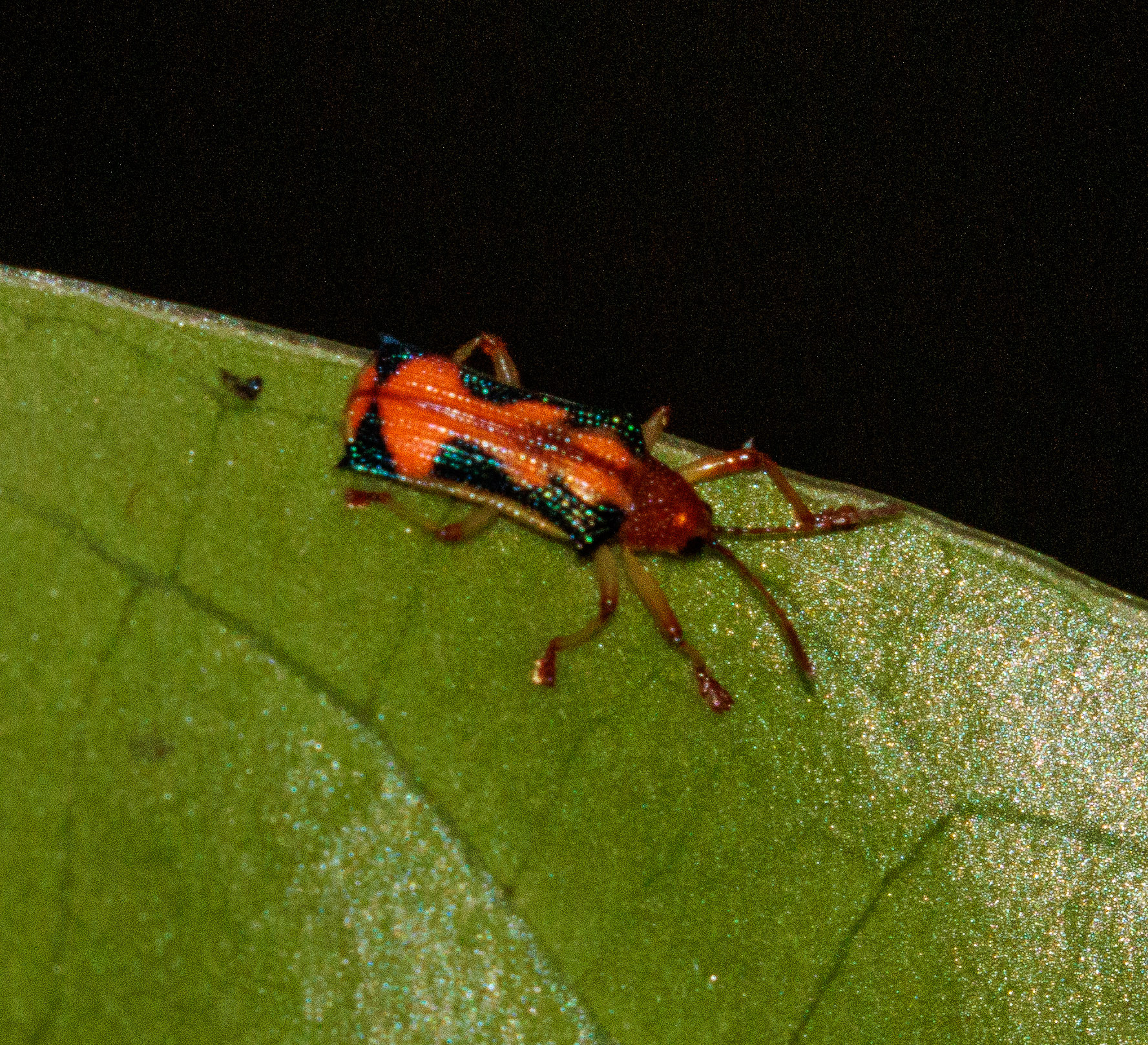
Sceloenopla bahiana, Brazil

Sceloenopla is a genus of tortoise beetles and hispines in the family Chrysomelidae. There are more than 140 described species in Sceloenopla, found in the Neotropics.

== Species ==
The following species belong to the genus Sceloenopla:

1. Sceloenopla abbreviata (Baly, 1885)
2. Sceloenopla albofasicata Pic, 1937
3. Sceloenopla ampliata (Baly, 1885)
4. Sceloenopla anchoralis (Baly, 1858)
5. Sceloenopla annulipes (Pic, 1932)
6. Sceloenopla antennata (Baly, 1885)
7. Sceloenopla apicalis (Baly, 1858)
8. Sceloenopla apicicornis (Guérin-Méneville in Cuvier, 1844)
9. Sceloenopla apicispina Staines, 2002
10. Sceloenopla atricollis (Weise, 1910)
11. Sceloenopla atricornis (Pic, 1929)
12. Sceloenopla atrospina (Pic, 1929)
13. Sceloenopla bahiana Uhmann, 1938
14. Sceloenopla balyi (Grimshaw, 1897)
15. Sceloenopla basalis (Pic, 1929)
16. Sceloenopla bicolorata Staines, 2002
17. Sceloenopla bicoloricornis Pic, 1929
18. Sceloenopla bidens (Fabricius, 1792)
19. Sceloenopla bidentata Staines, 2002
20. Sceloenopla bilineata Pic, 1929
21. Sceloenopla bimaculaticollis (Pic, 1948)
22. Sceloenopla boliviensis Pic, 1929
23. Sceloenopla brevispina (Pic, 1929)
24. Sceloenopla callangana Pic, 1929
25. Sceloenopla calopteroides (Weise, 1904)
26. Sceloenopla carinata (Fabricius, 1801)
27. Sceloenopla carinaticornis Pic, 1929
28. Sceloenopla cassidiformis Pic, 1929
29. Sceloenopla cayennensis Pic, 1929
30. Sceloenopla championi (Baly, 1885)
31. Sceloenopla chevrolatii (Baly, 1858)
32. Sceloenopla cincta (Weise, 1905)
33. Sceloenopla cognata (Baly, 1858)
34. Sceloenopla collaris (Baly, 1858)
35. Sceloenopla columbica (Weise, 1910)
36. Sceloenopla contraria Weise, 1921
37. Sceloenopla costaricea Uhmann, 1930
38. Sceloenopla crassicornis Pic, 1929
39. Sceloenopla cyanea (Brême, 1844)
40. Sceloenopla decens (Weise, 1912)
41. Sceloenopla deyrollei (Baly, 1858)
42. Sceloenopla dilatata (Guérin-Méneville in Cuvier, 1844)
43. Sceloenopla elevata (Fabricius, 1801)
44. Sceloenopla elongata (Guérin-Méneville in Cuvier, 1844)
45. Sceloenopla emarginata (Fabricius, 1792)
46. Sceloenopla erudita (Baly, 1885)
47. Sceloenopla evanida Uhmann, 1937
48. Sceloenopla expanda Staines, 2002
49. Sceloenopla femoralis (Weise, 1910)
50. Sceloenopla ferox (Baly, 1885)
51. Sceloenopla flava Staines, 2002
52. Sceloenopla fraterna (Baly, 1885)
53. Sceloenopla freyi Uhmann, 1956
54. Sceloenopla fryella (Baly, 1858)
55. Sceloenopla gigantea (Guérin-Méneville in Cuvier, 1844)
56. Sceloenopla godmani (Baly, 1885)
57. Sceloenopla goniaptera (Perty, 1832)
58. Sceloenopla gracilenta (Baly, 1885)
59. Sceloenopla gratiosa (Baly, 1858)
60. Sceloenopla haroldi (Baly, 1878)
61. Sceloenopla humeralis Pic, 1929
62. Sceloenopla integra Uhmann, 1930
63. Sceloenopla javeti (Baly, 1858)
64. Sceloenopla kaestneri Uhmann, 1957
65. Sceloenopla kolbei (Weise, 1910)
66. Sceloenopla kraatzi (Weise, 1921)
67. Sceloenopla laeta (Baly, 1858)
68. Sceloenopla lampyridiformis Staines, 2002
69. Sceloenopla lineolata Uhmann, 1953
70. Sceloenopla lojaensis (Pic, 1932)
71. Sceloenopla longula (Baly, 1886)
72. Sceloenopla lugubris (Weise, 1910)
73. Sceloenopla lutena Staines, 2002
74. Sceloenopla lycoides (Weise, 1881)
75. Sceloenopla lydiae Uhmann, 1954
76. Sceloenopla maculata (Olivier, 1792)
77. Sceloenopla maculipes (Weise, 1912)
78. Sceloenopla major (Pic, 1929)
79. Sceloenopla mantecada Sanderson, 1967
80. Sceloenopla marcapatana (Pic, 1932)
81. Sceloenopla maronica Uhmann, 1940
82. Sceloenopla matronalis (Weise, 1905)
83. Sceloenopla mauliki Uhmann, 1930
84. Sceloenopla melanospila (Weise, 1905)
85. Sceloenopla meridionalis (Weise, 1910)
86. Sceloenopla minuta Staines, 2002
87. Sceloenopla mitis (Weise, 1905)
88. Sceloenopla moesta Weise, 1921
89. Sceloenopla monrosi Uhmann, 1959
90. Sceloenopla multistriata Uhmann, 1930
91. Sceloenopla munda (Weise, 1905)
92. Sceloenopla nigripes (Weise, 1910)
93. Sceloenopla nigropicta Staines, 2002
94. Sceloenopla obscurovittata (Baly, 1885)
95. Sceloenopla obsoleta (Baly, 1858)
96. Sceloenopla octopunctata (Baly, 1858)
97. Sceloenopla ornata Uhmann, 1954
98. Sceloenopla ovata (Weise, 1910)
99. Sceloenopla pallida (Baly, 1885)
100. Sceloenopla parvula (Baly, 1858)
101. Sceloenopla pascoei (Baly, 1858)
102. Sceloenopla peruviana (Pic, 1929)
103. Sceloenopla posticata (Baly, 1885)
104. Sceloenopla pretiosa (Baly, 1858)
105. Sceloenopla proxima (Baly, 1885)
106. Sceloenopla pulchella (Baly, 1858)
107. Sceloenopla pulcherrima (Baly, 1858)
108. Sceloenopla quinquemaculata (Guérin-Méneville in Cuvier, 1844)
109. Sceloenopla rectelineata (Pic, 1929)
110. Sceloenopla robinsonii (Baly, 1858)
111. Sceloenopla roseicollis Spaeth in Uhmann, 1958
112. Sceloenopla rubivittata Staines, 2002
113. Sceloenopla rubrosinuata (Pic, 1921)
114. Sceloenopla sanguinea Staines, 2002
115. Sceloenopla scherzeri (Baly, 1858)
116. Sceloenopla schildi Uhmann, 1930
117. Sceloenopla serraticornis (Fabricius, 1792)
118. Sceloenopla sheppardi (Baly, 1858)
119. Sceloenopla simplex (Weise, 1910)
120. Sceloenopla singularis (Weise, 1910)
121. Sceloenopla sinuaticollis (Pic, 1932)
122. Sceloenopla smithii (Baly, 1858)
123. Sceloenopla soluta (Weise, 1905)
124. Sceloenopla sparsa (Weise, 1910)
125. Sceloenopla spectabilis (Baly, 1858)
126. Sceloenopla stevensii (Baly, 1858)
127. Sceloenopla subcornuta (Baly, 1858)
128. Sceloenopla subfasciata (Pic, 1928)
129. Sceloenopla subparallela (Baly, 1885)
130. Sceloenopla tarsata (Baly, 1858)
131. Sceloenopla tetracantha (Champion, 1920)
132. Sceloenopla trivittata Staines, 2002
133. Sceloenopla unicostata Staines, 2002
134. Sceloenopla unidentata (Olivier, 1792)
135. Sceloenopla univittata Staines, 2002
136. Sceloenopla varia Uhmann, 1930
137. Sceloenopla varipes (Weise, 1921)
138. Sceloenopla violaceipennis (Pic, 1929)
139. Sceloenopla viridifasciata (Pic, 1929)
140. Sceloenopla viridinotata (Pic, 1929)
141. Sceloenopla vitticollis (Weise, 1905)
142. Sceloenopla westwoodii (Baly, 1858)
143. Sceloenopla whitei (Baly, 1858)

== Fossil species ==
- †Sceloenopla ambarensis Santiago-Blay et al., 1996 (Dominican amber)
- †Sceloenopla dominicana Samuelson & Staines, 2000 (Dominican amber)
- †Sceloenopla stainesorum Santiago-Blay & Craig, 1999 (Dominican amber)

== Species of unknown status ==
- Sceloenopla compressicornis (Fabricius, 1801)

== Selected former species ==
- Sceloenopla callosa (Baly, 1885)
- Sceloenopla germaini (Pic, 1929)
- Sceloenopla nevermanni Uhmann, 1930
