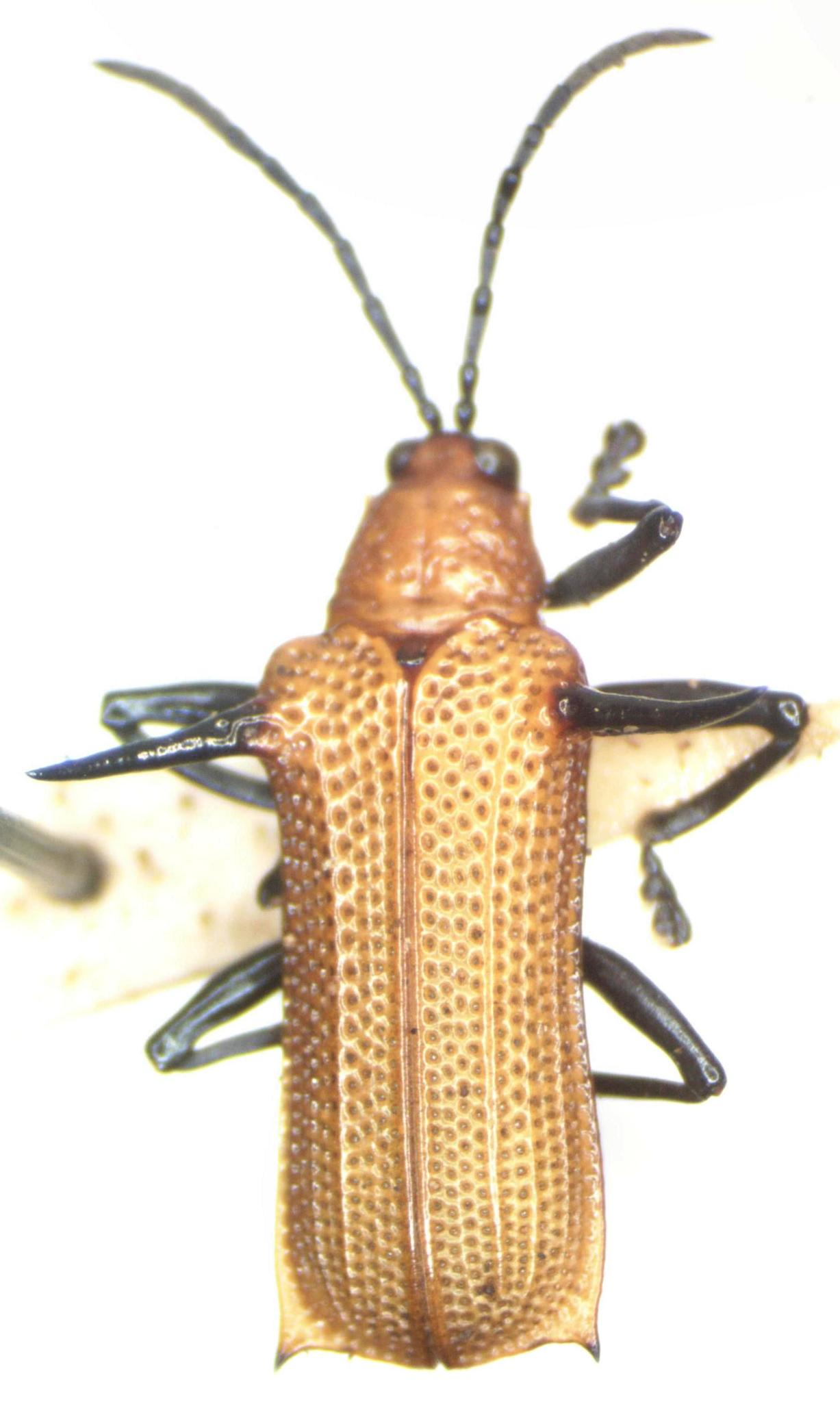

Scientific classification
- Kingdom: Animalia
- Phylum: Arthropoda
- Class: Insecta
- Order: Coleoptera
- Suborder: Polyphaga
- Infraorder: Cucujiformia
- Family: Chrysomelidae
- Genus: Sceloenopla
- Species: S. ferox

Binomial name
- Sceloenopla ferox (Baly, 1885)

Synonyms
- Cephalodonta ferox Baly, 1885

= Sceloenopla ferox =

Species of beetle

Sceloenopla ferox is a species of beetle of the family Chrysomelidae. It is found in Nicaragua.

== Description ==
The antennae are slender, filiform and more than half the length of the body. The thorax is not broader than long and subconic, the sides straight and parallel from the base to the middle, then obliquely converging and sinuate to the apex, the anterior angle produced anteriorly into a strong subacute tooth. The upper surface is subcylindrical, transversely grooved at the base and closely foveolate-punctate. The elytra are parallel, slightly dilated posteriorly, the apical margin obtusely rounded and entire, the posterior angle armed with a strong flattened acute tooth, the apex of which looks directly backwards. The upper surface has ten, at the extreme base eleven, regular rows of punctures, the fourth interspace from the suture moderately costate. The humeral callus is laterally produced, and armed with a very long acute black spine, the apex of which extends directly outwards.

== Life history ==
No host plant has been documented for this species.
