= Sceloenopla carinata =

Scientific classification
- Kingdom: Animalia
- Phylum: Arthropoda
- Class: Insecta
- Order: Coleoptera
- Suborder: Polyphaga
- Infraorder: Cucujiformia
- Family: Chrysomelidae
- Genus: Sceloenopla
- Species: S. carinata

Binomial name
- Sceloenopla carinata (Fabricius, 1801)

Synonyms
- Hispa carinata Fabricius, 1801; Cephalodonta carinata; Sceloenopla carinata corumbica Uhmann, 1937; Sceloenopla (Microdonta) guyanensis Pic, 1929; Cephalodonta (Microdonta) jatahyensis Pic, 1929

Species of beetle

Sceloenopla carinata is a species of beetle of the family Chrysomelidae. It is found in Brazil (Amazonas, Bahia, Goiás) and French Guiana.

== Description ==
Adults are narrow, elongate and subdepressed. The elytra are unicostate and fulvous above. The vertex, antennae, eyes, the lateral border of the thorax and two large patches on the disc, united at their base, the apex, and a large tripartite patch on the anterior half of the elytra, are all black.

== Life history ==
The recorded host plants for this species are palms (Arecaceae).
