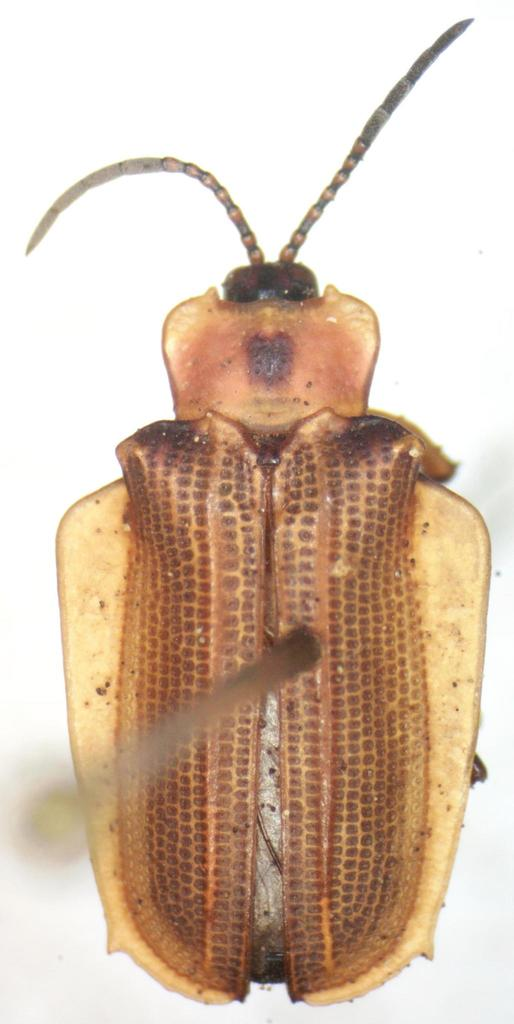

Scientific classification
- Kingdom: Animalia
- Phylum: Arthropoda
- Class: Insecta
- Order: Coleoptera
- Suborder: Polyphaga
- Infraorder: Cucujiformia
- Family: Chrysomelidae
- Genus: Sceloenopla
- Species: S. lampyridiformis

Binomial name
- Sceloenopla lampyridiformis Staines, 2002

= Sceloenopla lampyridiformis =

Species of beetle

Sceloenopla lampyridiformis is a species of beetle of the family Chrysomelidae. It is found in Costa Rica.

== Description ==
Adults reach a length of about 7.3-10.1 mm. The head is black with reddish markings and the pronotum is yellow-ochre with a rosaceous blush and a black longitudinal medial vitta. The elytra are dark yellowish-brown or brown with a yellow ochre vitta.

== Life history ==
The larvae have been recorded mining the leaves of an unidentified Viscaceae species.

== Etymology ==
The species name is derived from lampyrid (fireflies) and the Latin word formis (meaning form) and refers to the overall appearance as a firefly.
