= Sceloenopla stevensii =

Scientific classification
- Kingdom: Animalia
- Phylum: Arthropoda
- Class: Insecta
- Order: Coleoptera
- Suborder: Polyphaga
- Infraorder: Cucujiformia
- Family: Chrysomelidae
- Genus: Sceloenopla
- Species: S. stevensii

Binomial name
- Sceloenopla stevensii (Baly, 1858)

Synonyms
- Cephalodonta stevensii Baly, 1858

Species of beetle

Sceloenopla stevensii is a species of beetle of the family Chrysomelidae. It is found in Brazil (Amazonas).

== Description ==
Adults are elongate, parallel, moderately convex, subdepressed along the back and pale rufo-fulvous. The antennae are black, their five terminal, together with the apex of the two preceding joints, fulvous. The elytra are pale rufo-violaceous, their apical margin, and also their posterior angles, dark metallic green. Each elytron has four large fulvous spots, covering nearly the whole of their surface.

== Life history ==
No host plant has been documented for this species.
