= Sceloenopla scherzeri =

Scientific classification
- Kingdom: Animalia
- Phylum: Arthropoda
- Class: Insecta
- Order: Coleoptera
- Suborder: Polyphaga
- Infraorder: Cucujiformia
- Family: Chrysomelidae
- Genus: Sceloenopla
- Species: S. scherzeri

Binomial name
- Sceloenopla scherzeri (Baly, 1858)

Synonyms
- Cephalodonta scherzeri Baly, 1858; Sceloenopla (Microdonta) biolleyi Pic, 1929; Sceloenopla scherzeri tertiaria Uhmann, 1961

Species of beetle

Sceloenopla scherzeri is a species of beetle of the family Chrysomelidae. It is found in Costa Rica, Guatemala, Nicaragua and Panama.

== Description ==
Adults are elongate, subdepressed, dilated towards the apex and pale opaque fulvous. The antennae, eyes, a central vitta, and the extreme lateral border of the thorax, the scutellum, and a short longitudinal stripe at the base of the elytra, just within their outer border, are all black.

== Life history ==
The recorded host plant for this species is Davilla nitida.
