= Sceloenopla decens =

Scientific classification
- Kingdom: Animalia
- Phylum: Arthropoda
- Class: Insecta
- Order: Coleoptera
- Suborder: Polyphaga
- Infraorder: Cucujiformia
- Family: Chrysomelidae
- Genus: Sceloenopla
- Species: S. decens

Binomial name
- Sceloenopla decens (Weise, 1912)

Synonyms
- Cephalodonta (Microdonta) decens Weise, 1912

Species of beetle

Sceloenopla decens is a species of beetle of the family Chrysomelidae. It is found in Colombia.

== Life history ==
No host plant has been documented for this species.
