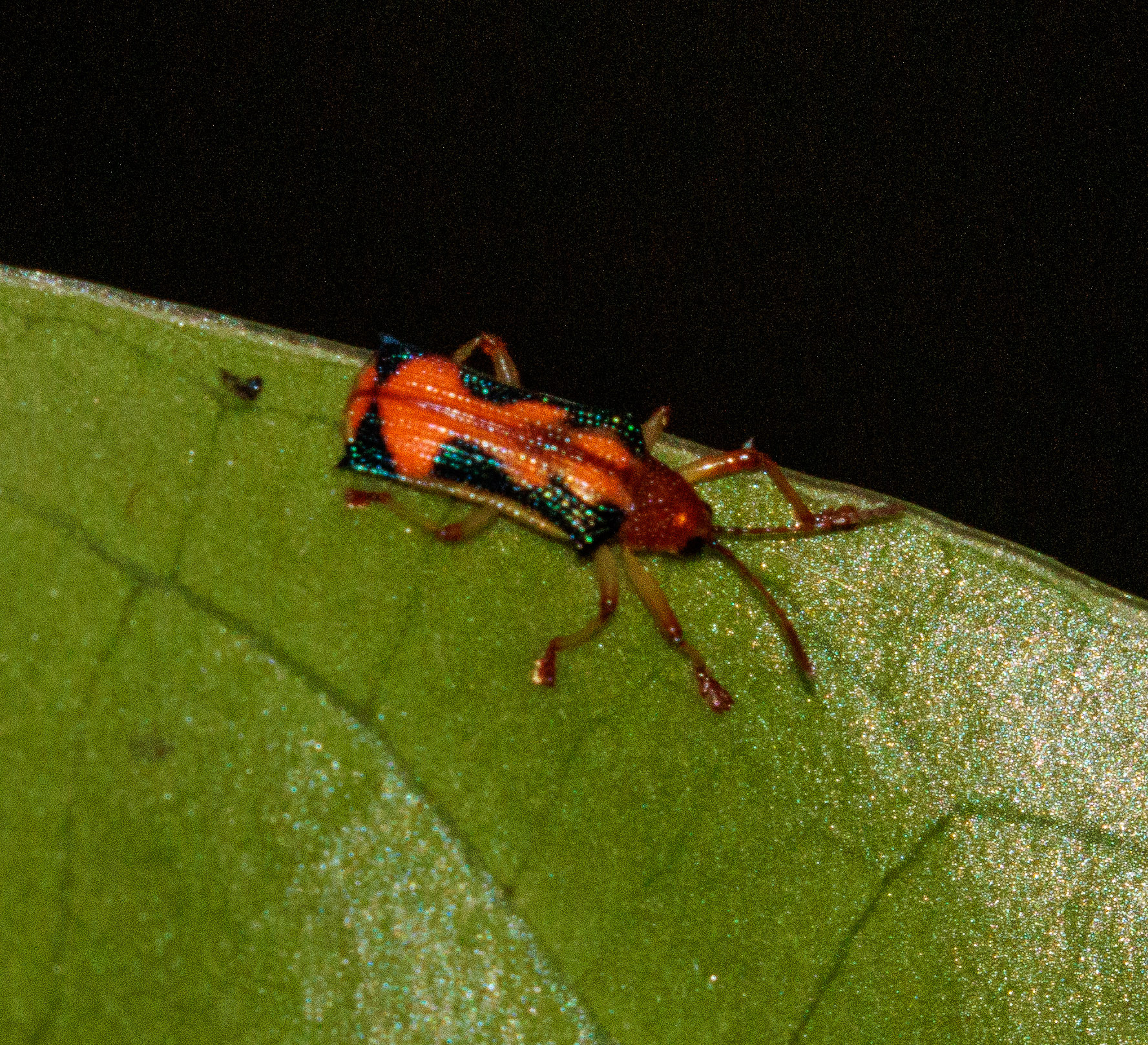

Scientific classification
- Kingdom: Animalia
- Phylum: Arthropoda
- Class: Insecta
- Order: Coleoptera
- Suborder: Polyphaga
- Infraorder: Cucujiformia
- Family: Chrysomelidae
- Genus: Sceloenopla
- Species: S. bahiana

Binomial name
- Sceloenopla bahiana Uhmann, 1938

= Sceloenopla bahiana =

Species of beetle

Sceloenopla bahiana is a species of beetle of the family Chrysomelidae. It is found in Brazil (Bahia).

== Life history ==
The recorded host plants for this species are Rubiaceae species.
