= Sceloenopla parvula =

Scientific classification
- Kingdom: Animalia
- Phylum: Arthropoda
- Class: Insecta
- Order: Coleoptera
- Suborder: Polyphaga
- Infraorder: Cucujiformia
- Family: Chrysomelidae
- Genus: Sceloenopla
- Species: S. parvula

Binomial name
- Sceloenopla parvula (Baly, 1858)

Synonyms
- Cephalodonta parvula Baly, 1858

Species of beetle

Sceloenopla parvula is a species of beetle of the family Chrysomelidae. It is found in Brazil (Amazonas).

== Description ==
Adults are elongate, parallel and pale fulvous. The antennae are black, their four apical joints pale fulvous. The elytra have a sutural stripe, a marginal vitta, which is abbreviated behind the middle, and a blackish-piceous large, common, transverse subapical patch.

== Life history ==
No host plant has been documented for this species.
