= Sceloenopla sanguinea =

Scientific classification
- Kingdom: Animalia
- Phylum: Arthropoda
- Class: Insecta
- Order: Coleoptera
- Suborder: Polyphaga
- Infraorder: Cucujiformia
- Family: Chrysomelidae
- Genus: Sceloenopla
- Species: S. sanguinea

Binomial name
- Sceloenopla sanguinea Staines, 2002

Species of beetle

Sceloenopla sanguinea is a species of beetle of the family Chrysomelidae. It is found in Costa Rica.

== Description ==
Adults reach a length of about 5.3-5.9 mm. The antennae, head and legs are black, while the pronotum is bright red with a medial black vitta and black lateral margins. The elytra are bright red.

== Life history ==
No host plant has been documented for this species.

== Etymology ==
The species name is derived from the Latin word sanguis (meaning blood) and refers to the bright red dorsal coloration.
