= Sceloenopla spectabilis =

Scientific classification
- Kingdom: Animalia
- Phylum: Arthropoda
- Class: Insecta
- Order: Coleoptera
- Suborder: Polyphaga
- Infraorder: Cucujiformia
- Family: Chrysomelidae
- Genus: Sceloenopla
- Species: S. spectabilis

Binomial name
- Sceloenopla spectabilis (Baly, 1858)

Synonyms
- Cephalodonta spectabilis Baly, 1858

Species of beetle

Sceloenopla spectabilis is a species of beetle of the family Chrysomelidae. It is found in Colombia and French Guiana.

== Description ==
Adults are broadly elongate, rather wider behind, subdepressed above and rufo-fulvous. The elytra are rufo-fulvous with a metallic reflexion, each marked with six pale fulvous spots.

== Life history ==
No host plant has been documented for this species.
