= Sceloenopla abbreviata =

Scientific classification
- Kingdom: Animalia
- Phylum: Arthropoda
- Class: Insecta
- Order: Coleoptera
- Suborder: Polyphaga
- Infraorder: Cucujiformia
- Family: Chrysomelidae
- Genus: Sceloenopla
- Species: S. abbreviata

Binomial name
- Sceloenopla abbreviata (Baly, 1885)

Synonyms
- Cephalodonta abbreviata Baly, 1885

Species of beetle

Sceloenopla abbreviata is a species of beetle of the family Chrysomelidae. It is found in Panama.

== Description ==
The vertex and front are smooth and impunctate and the antennae are filiform, with the joints cylindrical, the basal one short, the second to the fifth nearly equal in length, each twice the length of the first, the sixth to the tenth rather shorter. The thorax is rather broader than long, the sides straight and slightly diverging from the base to just behind the middle, then obliquely converging and feebly sinuate to the apex, the anterior angle armed with a short oblique tooth. The disc is slightly excavated behind the middle, impressed with large round punctures, placed irregularly over the surface. The elytra are parallel before the middle, slightly dilated posteriorly, hinder angle armed with a stout acute tooth and the apical margin obtusely rounded. The entire upper surface is flattened along the suture, convex on the sides and the humeral callus is laterally produced and acute. Each elytron has ten, at the base with eleven, rows of large deeply impressed punctures, the fourth interspace subcostate, the black vittae are arranged as follows: one sutural, the others (one on either side) sublateral and covering the outer ridge of the humeral callus.

== Life history ==
No host plant has been documented for this species.
