= Sceloenopla lycoides =

Scientific classification
- Kingdom: Animalia
- Phylum: Arthropoda
- Class: Insecta
- Order: Coleoptera
- Suborder: Polyphaga
- Infraorder: Cucujiformia
- Family: Chrysomelidae
- Genus: Sceloenopla
- Species: S. lycoides

Binomial name
- Sceloenopla lycoides (Weise, 1881)

Synonyms
- Cephalodonta lycoides Weise, 1881

Species of beetle

Sceloenopla lycoides is a species of beetle of the family Chrysomelidae. It is found in Colombia and Ecuador.

== Life history ==
No host plant has been documented for this species.
