= Sceloenopla albofasicata =

Scientific classification
- Kingdom: Animalia
- Phylum: Arthropoda
- Class: Insecta
- Order: Coleoptera
- Suborder: Polyphaga
- Infraorder: Cucujiformia
- Family: Chrysomelidae
- Genus: Sceloenopla
- Species: S. albofasicata

Binomial name
- Sceloenopla albofasicata Pic, 1938

Synonyms
- Sceloenopla (Microdonta) albofasicata Pic, 1937

Species of beetle

Sceloenopla albofasicata is a species of beetle of the family Chrysomelidae. It is found in French Guiana.

== Life history ==
No host plant has been documented for this species.
