= Sceloenopla lutena =

Scientific classification
- Kingdom: Animalia
- Phylum: Arthropoda
- Class: Insecta
- Order: Coleoptera
- Suborder: Polyphaga
- Infraorder: Cucujiformia
- Family: Chrysomelidae
- Genus: Sceloenopla
- Species: S. lutena

Binomial name
- Sceloenopla lutena Staines, 2002

Species of beetle

Sceloenopla lutena is a species of beetle of the family Chrysomelidae. It is found in Costa Rica.

== Description ==
Adults reach a length of about 6.3-7.9 mm. They are yellowish-brown, with the head and antennae darker.

== Life history ==
The host plant is unknown, but the species was collected from Virola koschnyi.

== Etymology ==
The species name is derived from the Latin word lutena (meaning yellow) and refers to the yellowish body colour.
