= Sceloenopla subcornuta =

Scientific classification
- Kingdom: Animalia
- Phylum: Arthropoda
- Class: Insecta
- Order: Coleoptera
- Suborder: Polyphaga
- Infraorder: Cucujiformia
- Family: Chrysomelidae
- Genus: Sceloenopla
- Species: S. subcornuta

Binomial name
- Sceloenopla subcornuta (Baly, 1858)

Synonyms
- Cephalodonta subcornuta Baly, 1858

Species of beetle

Sceloenopla subcornuta is a species of beetle of the family Chrysomelidae. It is found in Brazil (Amazonas).

== Description ==
Adults are broadly elongate, rather wider behind, depressed above and rufo-fulvous. The rufo-violaceous elytra are produced at the posterior angles into a flattened, acute, black spine. Each elytron has five large fulvous spots, which almost entirely cover the whole surface.

== Life history ==
No host plant has been documented for this species.
