= Sceloenopla matronalis =

Scientific classification
- Kingdom: Animalia
- Phylum: Arthropoda
- Class: Insecta
- Order: Coleoptera
- Suborder: Polyphaga
- Infraorder: Cucujiformia
- Family: Chrysomelidae
- Genus: Sceloenopla
- Species: S. matronalis

Binomial name
- Sceloenopla matronalis (Weise, 1905)

Synonyms
- Cephalodonta matronalis Weise, 1905

Species of beetle

Sceloenopla matronalis is a species of beetle of the family Chrysomelidae. It is found in Bolivia and Peru.

== Life history ==
No host plant has been documented for this species.
