= Sceloenopla elongata =

Scientific classification
- Kingdom: Animalia
- Phylum: Arthropoda
- Clade: Pancrustacea
- Class: Insecta
- Order: Coleoptera
- Suborder: Polyphaga
- Infraorder: Cucujiformia
- Family: Chrysomelidae
- Genus: Sceloenopla
- Species: S. elongata

Binomial name
- Sceloenopla elongata (Guérin-Méneville, 1844)

Synonyms
- Microdonta elongata Guérin-Méneville, 1844; Cephalodonta elongata

Species of beetle

Sceloenopla elongata is a species of beetle of the family Chrysomelidae. It is found in French Guiana.

== Description ==
Adults have a fulvous head, the antennae, jaws, eyes, a spot on each side behind the latter, and a patch on the vertex, are black. The thorax is black, but a large stripe on either side, and the middle beneath, are fulvous. The elytra are elongate and black, there is a fulvous humeral stripe, confluent with the one on the thorax. The shoulders are prominent. The surface is deeply punctate-striate, each elytron with an elevated costa. Their apex with a spine at the posterior angles and two others, geminate, at the sutural angle. Beneath, with the middle of the breast and the base of the abdomen, together with the base of the thighs, yellow.

== Life history ==
No host plant has been documented for this species.
