= Sceloenopla expanda =

Scientific classification
- Kingdom: Animalia
- Phylum: Arthropoda
- Class: Insecta
- Order: Coleoptera
- Suborder: Polyphaga
- Infraorder: Cucujiformia
- Family: Chrysomelidae
- Genus: Sceloenopla
- Species: S. expanda

Binomial name
- Sceloenopla expanda Staines, 2002

Species of beetle

Sceloenopla expanda is a species of beetle of the family Chrysomelidae. It is found in Costa Rica.

== Description ==
Adults reach a length of about 10.1 mm. The head and pronotum are rosy red, the latter with an oblong medial macula. The antennae are pale yellow, with the apical four antennomeres black. The elytra are yellowish with darker markings.

== Life history ==
No host plant has been documented for this species.

== Etymology ==
The species name is derived from Latin expando (meaning spread out) and refers to the greatly expanded elytra.
