= Sceloenopla longula =

Scientific classification
- Kingdom: Animalia
- Phylum: Arthropoda
- Class: Insecta
- Order: Coleoptera
- Suborder: Polyphaga
- Infraorder: Cucujiformia
- Family: Chrysomelidae
- Genus: Sceloenopla
- Species: S. longula

Binomial name
- Sceloenopla longula (Baly, 1886)

Synonyms
- Cephalodonta elongata Baly, 1885 (not Guérin-Méneville); Cephalodonta longula Baly, 1886; Cephalodonta elongatula Donckier, 1899

Species of beetle

Sceloenopla longula is a species of beetle of the family Chrysomelidae. It is found in Panama.

== Description ==
The antennae are rather more than half the length of the body, filiform and very slightly thickened towards the apex and with the joints cylindrical. The thorax is longer than broad, the sides straight and nearly parallel, very slightly bisinuate, obsoletely angulate, the anterior angle acute. The disc is closely foveolate-punctate. The elytra are broader than the thorax, the sides parallel, slightly constricted in the middle, very slightly dilated posteriorly and with the hinder angle obtuse and the apical margin obtusely rounded, sinuate just within the outer angle. The base has twelve, the middle disc ten, and the hinder disc eleven, regular rows of punctures, the fourth, sixth, and eighth interspaces thickened. The humeral callus is laterally elevated and obtuse.

== Life history ==
The recorded host plant is an unidentified Araceae species.
