= Sceloenopla bicolorata =

Scientific classification
- Kingdom: Animalia
- Phylum: Arthropoda
- Class: Insecta
- Order: Coleoptera
- Suborder: Polyphaga
- Infraorder: Cucujiformia
- Family: Chrysomelidae
- Genus: Sceloenopla
- Species: S. bicolorata

Binomial name
- Sceloenopla bicolorata Staines, 2002

Species of beetle

Sceloenopla bicolorata is a species of beetle of the family Chrysomelidae. It is found in Costa Rica.

== Description ==
Adults reach a length of about 7.7 – 8 mm. The head, pronotum and apical one-fourth of the elytra are yellowish, while the remainder of the elytra is dark metallic blue. The antennae are black.

== Life history ==
The species was found on the undersides of leaves of Sterculia recordiana papyracea.

== Etymology ==
The species name is derived from Latin bi (meaning two) and colorata (meaning colour) and refers to the two colours on the elytra.
