= Sceloenopla melanospila =

Scientific classification
- Kingdom: Animalia
- Phylum: Arthropoda
- Class: Insecta
- Order: Coleoptera
- Suborder: Polyphaga
- Infraorder: Cucujiformia
- Family: Chrysomelidae
- Genus: Sceloenopla
- Species: S. melanospila

Binomial name
- Sceloenopla melanospila (Weise, 1905)

Synonyms
- Cephalodonta melanospila Weise, 1905

Species of beetle

Sceloenopla melanospila is a species of beetle of the family Chrysomelidae. It is found in Bolivia and Peru.

== Life history ==
No host plant has been documented for this species.
