= Sceloenopla mantecada =

Scientific classification
- Kingdom: Animalia
- Phylum: Arthropoda
- Class: Insecta
- Order: Coleoptera
- Suborder: Polyphaga
- Infraorder: Cucujiformia
- Family: Chrysomelidae
- Genus: Sceloenopla
- Species: S. mantecada

Binomial name
- Sceloenopla mantecada Sanderson, 1967

Species of beetle

Sceloenopla mantecada is a species of beetle of the family Chrysomelidae. It is found in Puerto Rico.

== Life history ==
The host plant is unknown, but adults have been collected from Rapanea ferruginea.
