= Sceloenopla collaris =

Scientific classification
- Kingdom: Animalia
- Phylum: Arthropoda
- Class: Insecta
- Order: Coleoptera
- Suborder: Polyphaga
- Infraorder: Cucujiformia
- Family: Chrysomelidae
- Genus: Sceloenopla
- Species: S. collaris

Binomial name
- Sceloenopla collaris (Baly, 1858)

Synonyms
- Cephalodonta collaris Baly, 1858

Species of beetle

Sceloenopla collaris is a species of beetle of the family Chrysomelidae. It is found in Peru.

== Description ==
Adults are elongate and black, with the thorax, scutellum, and the extreme base of the elytra red.

== Life history ==
No host plant has been documented for this species.
