= Sceloenopla subparallela =

Scientific classification
- Kingdom: Animalia
- Phylum: Arthropoda
- Class: Insecta
- Order: Coleoptera
- Suborder: Polyphaga
- Infraorder: Cucujiformia
- Family: Chrysomelidae
- Genus: Sceloenopla
- Species: S. subparallela

Binomial name
- Sceloenopla subparallela (Baly, 1885)

Synonyms
- Cephalodonta subparallela Baly, 1885

Species of beetle

Sceloenopla subparallela is a species of beetle of the family Chrysomelidae. It is found in Costa Rica and Panama.

== Description ==
The vertex and front are impunctate, the upper portion of the latter impressed with a fine longitudinal groove and the inter-antennal space with a short tooth. There is broad piceo-fulvous patch on either side of the vertex, which extends downwards along the inner orbit of the eye. The antennae are three fourths the length of the body and slender. The thorax is rather longer than broad, with the sides straight, bisinuate, and slightly but distinctly converging from the base to the apex. The hinder angle is laterally produced and acute and the anterior angle is armed with an oblique obtuse tooth. The upper surface is transversely convex, slightly flattened and excavated on the hinder disc, closely and strongly variolose-punctate, the puncturing on the sides irregular and much coarser than on the middle. A space immediately behind the anterior margin is free from punctures. The elytra are convex, broader than the thorax, parallel before the middle, very slightly dilated posteriorly, the lateral margin entire. The apex is obtusely rounded, its margin obsoletely serrulate, the posterior angle armed with a stout acute tooth, the apex of which is directed backwards. The humeral callus is distinct, obtuse and not laterally produced. Each elytron has, at its base eleven, and on the rest of its surface ten, longitudinal rows of large deeply impressed punctures, which cover the whole surface.

== Life history ==
No host plant has been documented for this species.
