= Sceloenopla flava =

Scientific classification
- Kingdom: Animalia
- Phylum: Arthropoda
- Class: Insecta
- Order: Coleoptera
- Suborder: Polyphaga
- Infraorder: Cucujiformia
- Family: Chrysomelidae
- Genus: Sceloenopla
- Species: S. flava

Binomial name
- Sceloenopla flava Staines, 2002

Species of beetle

Sceloenopla flava is a species of beetle of the family Chrysomelidae. It is found in Costa Rica.

== Description ==
Adults reach a length of about 7.4-8 mm. They are pale yellowish, with the antennae mostly dark and the pronotum with a black medial vitta and black lateral margins. The elytra have a brownish black vitta.

== Life history ==
No host plant has been documented for this species.

== Etymology ==
The species name is derived from Latin flava (meaning yellow) and refers to the yellowish body colour.
