= Sceloenopla fryella =

Scientific classification
- Kingdom: Animalia
- Phylum: Arthropoda
- Class: Insecta
- Order: Coleoptera
- Suborder: Polyphaga
- Infraorder: Cucujiformia
- Family: Chrysomelidae
- Genus: Sceloenopla
- Species: S. fryella

Binomial name
- Sceloenopla fryella (Baly, 1858)

Synonyms
- Cephalodonta fryella Baly, 1858

Species of beetle

Sceloenopla fryella is a species of beetle of the family Chrysomelidae. It is found in Brazil.

== Description ==
Adults are broadly elongate, slightly broader behind, subdepressed above and bright rufo-fulvous. The elytra are produced at their posterior angles into an acute flattened spine, their apex truncate. The elytra are unicostate, rufo-fuscous, more or less stained with dark purple, each with eight large fulvous spots.

== Life history ==
No host plant has been documented for this species.
