= Sceloenopla haroldi =

Scientific classification
- Kingdom: Animalia
- Phylum: Arthropoda
- Class: Insecta
- Order: Coleoptera
- Suborder: Polyphaga
- Infraorder: Cucujiformia
- Family: Chrysomelidae
- Genus: Sceloenopla
- Species: S. haroldi

Binomial name
- Sceloenopla haroldi (Baly, 1878)

Synonyms
- Cephalodonta haroldi Baly, 1878

Species of beetle

Sceloenopla haroldi is a species of beetle of the family Chrysomelidae. It is found in Colombia.

== Life history ==
No host plant has been documented for this species.
