= Sceloenopla gracilenta =

Scientific classification
- Kingdom: Animalia
- Phylum: Arthropoda
- Class: Insecta
- Order: Coleoptera
- Suborder: Polyphaga
- Infraorder: Cucujiformia
- Family: Chrysomelidae
- Genus: Sceloenopla
- Species: S. gracilenta

Binomial name
- Sceloenopla gracilenta (Baly, 1885)

Synonyms
- Cephalodonta gracilenta Baly, 1885

Species of beetle

Sceloenopla gracilenta is a species of beetle of the family Chrysomelidae. It is found in Panama.

== Description ==
The vertex and front are shining and impunctate, the latter impressed with an oblong fovea. The face is armed between the antennae with a minute tooth. The antennae nearly three fourths the length of the body, slender and filiform. The thorax is scarcely longer than broad, the sides straight and parallel from the base to just behind the middle, then obliquely converging to the apex, the anterior angle armed with a short obtuse tooth. The upper surface is closely covered with large irregular foveolate punctures, the space immediately behind the apical margin however, is impunctate. There is a blackish-piceous narrow vitta on the medial disc, as well as a few of punctures on the extreme lateral margin in the same colour. On the vitta is a very narrow and slightly raised longitudinal line. The elytra are elongate and parallel, the sides very slightly sinuate and constricted in the middle and the apex obtusely rounded, the hinder angle armed with a short, acute, flattened spine, the apex of which looks directly backwards. The upper surface is convex on the sides and apex, flattened along the suture. The humeral callus is produced laterally, its apex extending slightly beyond the lateral margin. Each elytron has ten, at the extreme base eleven, regular rows of large deep punctures, which cover nearly the whole surface. The fourth interspace obsoletely costate. There is a narrow vitta, extending from the apex of the humeral callus nearly to the middle of each elytron, less distinct and sometimes entirely obsolete posteriorly, together with the spine at the hinder angle, blackish-piceous, tinged with violaceous.

== Life history ==
No host plant has been documented for this species.
