= Sceloenopla costaricea =

Scientific classification
- Kingdom: Animalia
- Phylum: Arthropoda
- Class: Insecta
- Order: Coleoptera
- Suborder: Polyphaga
- Infraorder: Cucujiformia
- Family: Chrysomelidae
- Genus: Sceloenopla
- Species: S. costaricea

Binomial name
- Sceloenopla costaricea Uhmann, 1930

Species of beetle

Sceloenopla costaricea is a species of beetle of the family Chrysomelidae. It is found in Costa Rica.

== Life history ==
No host plant has been documented for this species.
