= Sceloenopla gratiosa =

Scientific classification
- Kingdom: Animalia
- Phylum: Arthropoda
- Class: Insecta
- Order: Coleoptera
- Suborder: Polyphaga
- Infraorder: Cucujiformia
- Family: Chrysomelidae
- Genus: Sceloenopla
- Species: S. gratiosa

Binomial name
- Sceloenopla gratiosa (Baly, 1858)

Synonyms
- Cephalodonta gratiosa Baly, 1858

Species of beetle

Sceloenopla gratiosa is a species of beetle of the family Chrysomelidae. It is found in Brazil.

== Description ==
Adults are elongate, subparallel, subdepressed above and pale fulvous. The scutellum is black and there are three blackish-aeneous vittae on the thorax. The elytra are bright metallic green, but a sutural line in front, the lateral border, a broad vitta on the disc, a flexuous near its apex, extending from the base (where it is confluent with the sutural line) nearly the whole length of the elytra, and an apical patch, are pale fulvous.

== Life history ==
No host plant has been documented for this species.
