= Sceloenopla viridifasciata =

Scientific classification
- Kingdom: Animalia
- Phylum: Arthropoda
- Class: Insecta
- Order: Coleoptera
- Suborder: Polyphaga
- Infraorder: Cucujiformia
- Family: Chrysomelidae
- Genus: Sceloenopla
- Species: S. viridifasciata

Binomial name
- Sceloenopla viridifasciata (Pic, 1929)

Synonyms
- Cephalodonta viridifasciata Pic, 1929

Species of beetle

Sceloenopla viridifasciata is a species of beetle of the family Chrysomelidae. It is found in Bolivia.

== Life history ==
No host plant has been documented for this species.
