= Sceloenopla varipes =

Scientific classification
- Kingdom: Animalia
- Phylum: Arthropoda
- Class: Insecta
- Order: Coleoptera
- Suborder: Polyphaga
- Infraorder: Cucujiformia
- Family: Chrysomelidae
- Genus: Sceloenopla
- Species: S. varipes

Binomial name
- Sceloenopla varipes (Weise, 1921)

Synonyms
- Sceloenopla (Microdonta) varipes Weise, 1921

Species of beetle

Sceloenopla varipes is a species of beetle of the family Chrysomelidae. It is found in Brazil (Amazonas).

== Life history ==
No host plant has been documented for this species.
