= Sceloenopla unidentata =

Scientific classification
- Kingdom: Animalia
- Phylum: Arthropoda
- Clade: Pancrustacea
- Class: Insecta
- Order: Coleoptera
- Suborder: Polyphaga
- Infraorder: Cucujiformia
- Family: Chrysomelidae
- Genus: Sceloenopla
- Species: S. unidentata

Binomial name
- Sceloenopla unidentata (Olivier, 1792)

Synonyms
- Hispa unidentata Olivier, 1792

Species of beetle

Sceloenopla unidentata is a species of beetle of the family Chrysomelidae. It is found in French Guiana and Suriname.

== Life history ==
No host plant has been documented for this species.
