= Sceloenopla pallida =

Scientific classification
- Kingdom: Animalia
- Phylum: Arthropoda
- Class: Insecta
- Order: Coleoptera
- Suborder: Polyphaga
- Infraorder: Cucujiformia
- Family: Chrysomelidae
- Genus: Sceloenopla
- Species: S. pallida

Binomial name
- Sceloenopla pallida (Baly, 1885)

Synonyms
- Cephalodonta pallida Baly, 1885

Species of beetle

Sceloenopla pallida is a species of beetle of the family Chrysomelidae. It is found in Nicaragua.

== Description ==
The head is smooth and the basal joint of the antennae is short. The thorax is rather broader than long, the sides parallel at the base, obtusely angulate in the middle, then obliquely converging towards the apex, the anterior angle subacute. The upper surface is convex on the sides, broadly flattened on the disc, slightly excavated behind the middle and closely covered with large round punctures. The apical margin is impunctate. The elytra are broader than the thorax, the sides increasing in width from the base towards their apex, more abruptly dilated behind the middle, the hinder angle armed with a small acute tooth, the apex of which is produced directly backwards. The lateral margin is entire and the apical margin is finely serrulate. The upper surface is convex on the sides and apex, flattened along the anterior two thirds of the suture. The humeral callus is laterally produced, its apex acute. Each elytron has ten rows of large deep punctures, the fourth interspace strongly costate for its whole length, the second, sixth, and eighth thickened behind the middle of the disc.

== Life history ==
No host plant has been documented for this species.
