= Sceloenopla chevrolatii =

Scientific classification
- Kingdom: Animalia
- Phylum: Arthropoda
- Class: Insecta
- Order: Coleoptera
- Suborder: Polyphaga
- Infraorder: Cucujiformia
- Family: Chrysomelidae
- Genus: Sceloenopla
- Species: S. chevrolatii

Binomial name
- Sceloenopla chevrolatii (Baly, 1858)

Synonyms
- Cephalodonta chevrolatii Baly, 1858

Species of beetle

Sceloenopla chevrolatii is a species of beetle of the family Chrysomelidae. It is found in Brazil.

== Description ==
Adults are broadly elongate, slightly broader behind, less depressed along the back, black and subopaque above. The head in front, a submarginal vitta on either side the thorax, and a short humeral stripe on the shoulders, are all fulvous.

== Life history ==
No host plant has been documented for this species.
