= Sceloenopla javeti =

Scientific classification
- Kingdom: Animalia
- Phylum: Arthropoda
- Class: Insecta
- Order: Coleoptera
- Suborder: Polyphaga
- Infraorder: Cucujiformia
- Family: Chrysomelidae
- Genus: Sceloenopla
- Species: S. javeti

Binomial name
- Sceloenopla javeti (Baly, 1858)

Synonyms
- Cephalodonta javeti Baly, 1858

Species of beetle

Sceloenopla javeti is a species of beetle of the family Chrysomelidae. It is found in Mexico (Veracruz).

== Description ==
Adults are broadly elongate, rather broader towards the apex and shining black beneath, but fulvous above. The antennae, a patch on the vertex, the extreme lateral margin, and a broad vitta down the centre of the thorax, the scutellum, a short sutural stripe, and the apex of the elytra, are all black.

== Life history ==
No host plant has been documented for this species.
