= Sceloenopla elevata =

Scientific classification
- Kingdom: Animalia
- Phylum: Arthropoda
- Class: Insecta
- Order: Coleoptera
- Suborder: Polyphaga
- Infraorder: Cucujiformia
- Family: Chrysomelidae
- Genus: Sceloenopla
- Species: S. elevata

Binomial name
- Sceloenopla elevata (Fabricius, 1801)

Synonyms
- Hispa elevata Fabricius, 1801; Cephalodonta elevata

Species of beetle

Sceloenopla elevata is a species of beetle of the family Chrysomelidae. It is found in Brazil, French Guiana, Guyana and Suriname.

== Description ==
Adults are elongate, subdepressed and black. The head (except for the eyes and antennae) and thorax are fulvous, the latter with two broad black vittae on the disc, and a black submarginal stripe on either side. The elytra are broadly dilated behind, unicostate, a humeral patch, and a broad sub-interrupted transverse band across the middle are fulvous.

== Life history ==
No host plant has been documented for this species.
