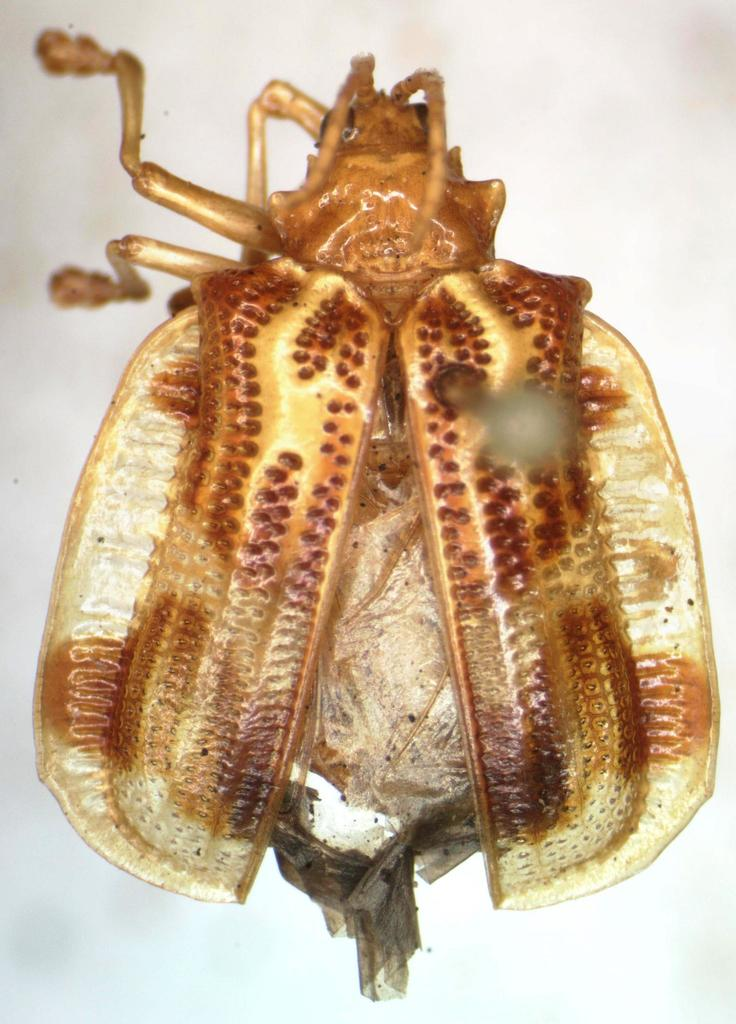

Scientific classification
- Kingdom: Animalia
- Phylum: Arthropoda
- Class: Insecta
- Order: Coleoptera
- Suborder: Polyphaga
- Infraorder: Cucujiformia
- Family: Chrysomelidae
- Genus: Sceloenopla
- Species: S. godmani

Binomial name
- Sceloenopla godmani (Baly, 1885)

Synonyms
- Cephalodonta godmani Baly, 1885

= Sceloenopla godmani =

Species of beetle

Sceloenopla godmani is a species of beetle of the family Chrysomelidae. It is found in Nicaragua and Panama.

== Description ==
The face has an acute tooth between the antennae. The antennae are rather more than half the length of the body and filiform. The thorax is twice as broad as long in the medial line, its anterior portion abruptly contracted to nearly half its width, the sides straight and obliquely diverging from the base to the middle, then to the apex entirely occupied by a deep angular notch, the anterior border of which is nearly perpendicular and forms the lateral margin of the constricted half of the thorax, whilst the hinder border is horizontal and runs directly outwards to form an acute angle with the oblique hinder portion of the margin. The apical angle is armed with a stout subacute tooth and the upper surface is transversely excavated at the base, impressed, but rather sparingly, with large irregular punctures, the medial disc nearly impunctate. The elytra are much broader than the thorax, the sides broadly dilated, obtusely rounded, the posterior angle not produced, obtusely angulate, the apical margin obliquely. Each elytron has ten longitudinal rows of deep punctures, arranged in pairs, the inner pair abbreviated at the base, the space being occupied by an irregular longitudinal callosity, which extends downwards from the basal margin for nearly one fourth the length of the elytron. The suture, together with the second, fourth, sixth, and eighth interspaces, is costate and rufous, the interspaces between the costae black.

== Life history ==
The recorded host plant for this species is Clusia flava.
