= Sceloenopla anchoralis =

Scientific classification
- Kingdom: Animalia
- Phylum: Arthropoda
- Class: Insecta
- Order: Coleoptera
- Suborder: Polyphaga
- Infraorder: Cucujiformia
- Family: Chrysomelidae
- Genus: Sceloenopla
- Species: S. anchoralis

Binomial name
- Sceloenopla anchoralis (Baly, 1858)

Synonyms
- Cephalodonta anchoralis Baly, 1858

Species of beetle

Sceloenopla anchoralis is a species of beetle of the family Chrysomelidae. It is found in Peru.

== Description ==
Adults are elongate, parallel and subdepressed along the back and above obscure fuscous. A patch on the vertex, the antennae, a broad vitta on the thorax, the scutellum, and a large common anchor-shaped patch placed on the anterior half of the elytra, together with their apex, are all black. The head is smooth and angled in front. The antennae are entirely black, filiform and slender, indistinctly incrassate at their apex, two-thirds the length of the body. The thorax is transverse-quadrate, the sides narrowly margined, notched at their extreme base, nearly straight behind, indistinctly angled in the middle, narrowed and bisinuate in front, the anterior angles produced obliquely into a stout subacute tooth, the posterior armed with a minute tooth. The elytra are broader than the thorax, the sides narrowly margined, parallel, slightly dilated and rounded towards the posterior angles, the latter produced almost directly backwards into a flattened acute spine.

== Life history ==
No host plant has been documented for this species.
