= Sceloenopla sheppardi =

Scientific classification
- Kingdom: Animalia
- Phylum: Arthropoda
- Class: Insecta
- Order: Coleoptera
- Suborder: Polyphaga
- Infraorder: Cucujiformia
- Family: Chrysomelidae
- Genus: Sceloenopla
- Species: S. sheppardi

Binomial name
- Sceloenopla sheppardi (Baly, 1858)

Synonyms
- Cephalodonta sheppardi Baly, 1858; Cephalodonta bryanti Bondar, 1937

Species of beetle

Sceloenopla sheppardi is a species of beetle of the family Chrysomelidae. It is found in Brazil (Bahia).

== Description ==
Adults are broadly elongate, slightly dilated behind, subdepressed and rufo-fulvous. The elytra have the posterior angles produced obliquely outwards and slightly backwards into a flattened, slightly curved, acute spine. The elytra are bright metallic green in front, pale rufo-fuscous with a metallic reflexion behind. Each elytron has seven large, badly-defined fulvous spots.

== Life history ==
The recorded host plants for this species are Cecropia peltata and Persea gratissima.
