= Sceloenopla championi =

Scientific classification
- Kingdom: Animalia
- Phylum: Arthropoda
- Class: Insecta
- Order: Coleoptera
- Suborder: Polyphaga
- Infraorder: Cucujiformia
- Family: Chrysomelidae
- Genus: Sceloenopla
- Species: S. championi

Binomial name
- Sceloenopla championi (Baly, 1885)

Synonyms
- Cephalodonta championi Baly, 1885

Species of beetle

Sceloenopla championi is a species of beetle of the family Chrysomelidae. It is found in Panama.

== Description ==
The head is rather strongly produced between the eyes, the front coarsely punctured and the inter-antennal space has a perpendicular ridge. The antennae are half the length of the body, attenuated at the base and apex and robust. The thorax is about one third broader than long, the sides deflexed, straight and parallel at the base, distinctly angulate just behind the middle, then straight and obliquely converging towards the apex, the anterior angle armed with a small obtuse tooth. Above transversely convex, deeply and rather broadly excavated on the hinder disc, closely and coarsely punctured, the medial line with a narrow longitudinal groove. A discoidal vitta, together with one on either side, just within the lateral margin, is black. The scutellum is oblong-quadrate. The elytra are broader than the thorax, dilated from the base towards the posterior angle, the latter broadly rounded. The apical margin is rounded, conjointly emarginate at the suture, the sutural angle armed with a short acute tooth. The lateral margin is finely, the apical one more coarsely serrulate and the upper surface is flattened between the humeral calli and also along the anterior two thirds of the suture, the calli themselves laterally prominent. The disc is deeply impressed at the base and apex, and has twelve, in the middle eleven, rows of large round punctures, the third and sixth interspaces costate. On the lateral margin of the disc, immediately below the humeral callus, is also a short, third costa. There is a dilated limb closely covered with similar punctures to those on the disc. At the extreme base, commencing at the scutellum and extending downwards for about one fourth the length of the elytron, is a narrow sutural black line, its hinder half bifurcate.

== Life history ==
No host plant has been documented for this species.
