= Sceloenopla robinsonii =

Scientific classification
- Kingdom: Animalia
- Phylum: Arthropoda
- Class: Insecta
- Order: Coleoptera
- Suborder: Polyphaga
- Infraorder: Cucujiformia
- Family: Chrysomelidae
- Genus: Sceloenopla
- Species: S. robinsonii

Binomial name
- Sceloenopla robinsonii (Baly, 1858)

Synonyms
- Cephalodonta robinsonii Baly, 1858

Species of beetle

Sceloenopla robinsonii is a species of beetle of the family Chrysomelidae. It is found in Peru.

== Description ==
Adults are elongate, subdepressed, rather broader behind and fulvous above. The eyes, antennae, a broad longitudinal stripe on the thorax, the scutellum, the apex of the elytra, a large patch in front and a small stripe at their humeral angles, are all black.

== Life history ==
No host plant has been documented for this species.
