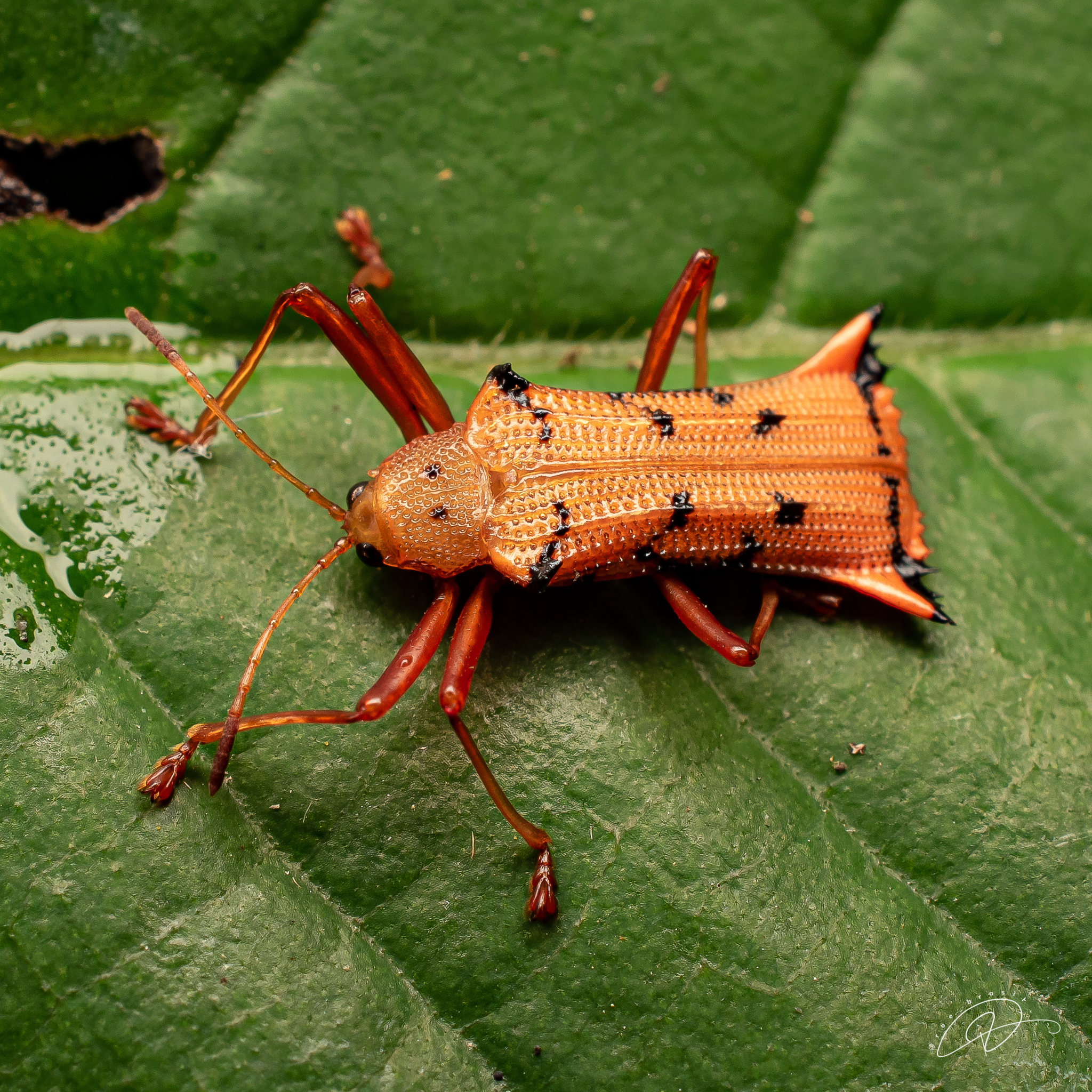

Scientific classification
- Kingdom: Animalia
- Phylum: Arthropoda
- Class: Insecta
- Order: Coleoptera
- Suborder: Polyphaga
- Infraorder: Cucujiformia
- Family: Chrysomelidae
- Genus: Sceloenopla
- Species: S. sparsa

Binomial name
- Sceloenopla sparsa (Weise, 1910)

Synonyms
- Cephalodonta sparsa Weise, 1910

= Sceloenopla sparsa =

Species of beetle

Sceloenopla sparsa is a species of beetle of the family Chrysomelidae. It is found in Brazil.

== Life history ==
No host plant has been documented for this species.
