= Sceloenopla minuta =

Scientific classification
- Kingdom: Animalia
- Phylum: Arthropoda
- Class: Insecta
- Order: Coleoptera
- Suborder: Polyphaga
- Infraorder: Cucujiformia
- Family: Chrysomelidae
- Genus: Sceloenopla
- Species: S. minuta

Binomial name
- Sceloenopla minuta Staines, 2002

Species of beetle

Sceloenopla minuta is a species of beetle of the family Chrysomelidae. It is found in Costa Rica.

== Description ==
Adults reach a length of about 4.4-4.9 mm. They are yellowish-brown, the pronotum has a black medial longitudinal vitta and black lateral margins. The elytra has the suture and apical one-third black.

== Life history ==
No host plant has been documented for this species.

== Etymology ==
The species name is derived from the Latin word minutus (meaning little or small) and refers to the small size of this species.
