= Sceloenopla vitticollis =

Scientific classification
- Kingdom: Animalia
- Phylum: Arthropoda
- Class: Insecta
- Order: Coleoptera
- Suborder: Polyphaga
- Infraorder: Cucujiformia
- Family: Chrysomelidae
- Genus: Sceloenopla
- Species: S. vitticollis

Binomial name
- Sceloenopla vitticollis (Weise, 1905)

Synonyms
- Cephalodonta vitticollis Weise, 1905; Sceloenopla (Microdonta) germaini Pic, 1929; Sceloenopla (Microdonta) germaini reducta Pic 1929; Chalepus (Macrochalepus) gamblei Papp, 1953

Species of beetle

Sceloenopla vitticollis is a species of beetle of the family Chrysomelidae. It is found in Bolivia and Peru.

== Life history ==
No host plant has been documented for this species.
