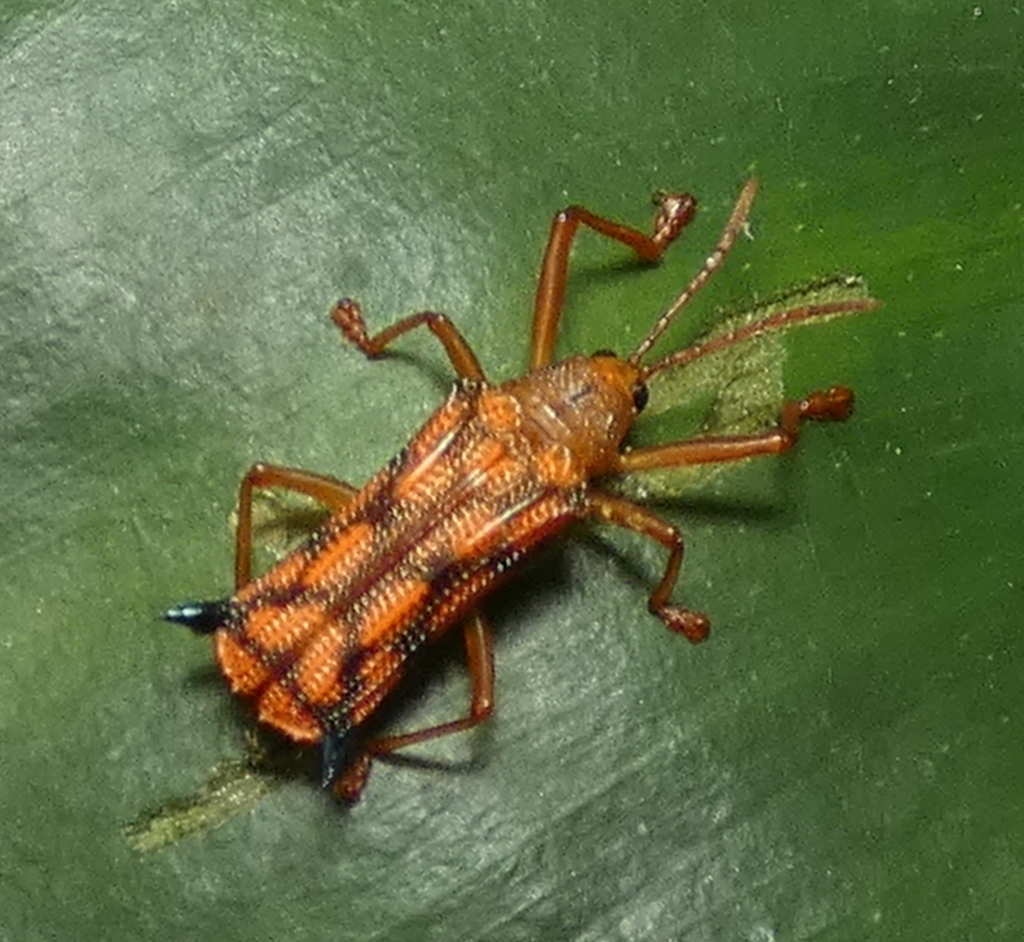

Scientific classification
- Kingdom: Animalia
- Phylum: Arthropoda
- Clade: Pancrustacea
- Class: Insecta
- Order: Coleoptera
- Suborder: Polyphaga
- Infraorder: Cucujiformia
- Family: Chrysomelidae
- Genus: Sceloenopla
- Species: S. pascoei

Binomial name
- Sceloenopla pascoei (Baly, 1858)

Synonyms
- Cephalodonta pascoei Baly, 1858

= Sceloenopla pascoei =

Species of beetle

Sceloenopla pascoei is a species of beetle of the family Chrysomelidae. It is found in Brazil (Pernambuco).

== Description ==
Adults are elongate, scarcely broader behind, depressed along the back and rufo-fulvous. Three vittae on the thorax and the elytra are metallic green, the latter each with nine bright fulvous spots. The posterior spine is black.

== Life history ==
No host plant has been documented for this species.
