= Sceloenopla whitei =

Scientific classification
- Kingdom: Animalia
- Phylum: Arthropoda
- Class: Insecta
- Order: Coleoptera
- Suborder: Polyphaga
- Infraorder: Cucujiformia
- Family: Chrysomelidae
- Genus: Sceloenopla
- Species: S. whitei

Binomial name
- Sceloenopla whitei (Baly, 1858)

Synonyms
- Cephalodonta whitei Baly, 1858

Species of beetle

Sceloenopla whitei is a species of beetle of the family Chrysomelidae. It is found in Colombia.

== Description ==
Adults are subcuneiform, subdepressed above and black. The thorax is yellow with a black central line. The elytra are black, unicostate, with a large yellow patch on the shoulder, and a broad yellow transverse band just behind the middle.

== Life history ==
No host plant has been documented for this species.
