= Sceloenopla apicalis =

Scientific classification
- Kingdom: Animalia
- Phylum: Arthropoda
- Class: Insecta
- Order: Coleoptera
- Suborder: Polyphaga
- Infraorder: Cucujiformia
- Family: Chrysomelidae
- Genus: Sceloenopla
- Species: S. apicalis

Binomial name
- Sceloenopla apicalis (Baly, 1858)

Synonyms
- Cephalodonta apicalis Baly, 1858

Species of beetle

Sceloenopla apicalis is a species of beetle of the family Chrysomelidae. It is found in Brazil (Amazonas).

== Description ==
Adults are elongate, subdepressed and black above. The face, two apical joints of the antennae, and two broad vittae on the thorax are yellow. The elytra are unicostate, with a yellow humeral patch, a yellow transverse band and a small yellow apical spot.

== Life history ==
No host plant has been documented for this species.
