= Sceloenopla univittata =

Scientific classification
- Kingdom: Animalia
- Phylum: Arthropoda
- Class: Insecta
- Order: Coleoptera
- Suborder: Polyphaga
- Infraorder: Cucujiformia
- Family: Chrysomelidae
- Genus: Sceloenopla
- Species: S. univittata

Binomial name
- Sceloenopla univittata Staines, 2002

Species of beetle

Sceloenopla univittata is a species of beetle of the family Chrysomelidae. It is found in Costa Rica.

== Description ==
Adults reach a length of about 7.1-8 mm. They are yellowish-brown, the pronotum with a black medial longitudinal stripe and the elytra with diffuse aeneous markings.

== Life history ==
No host plant has been documented for this species.

== Etymology ==
The species name is derived from the Latin word uni (meaning one) and vitta (meaning stripe) and refers to the medial longitudinal stripe on the pronotum.
