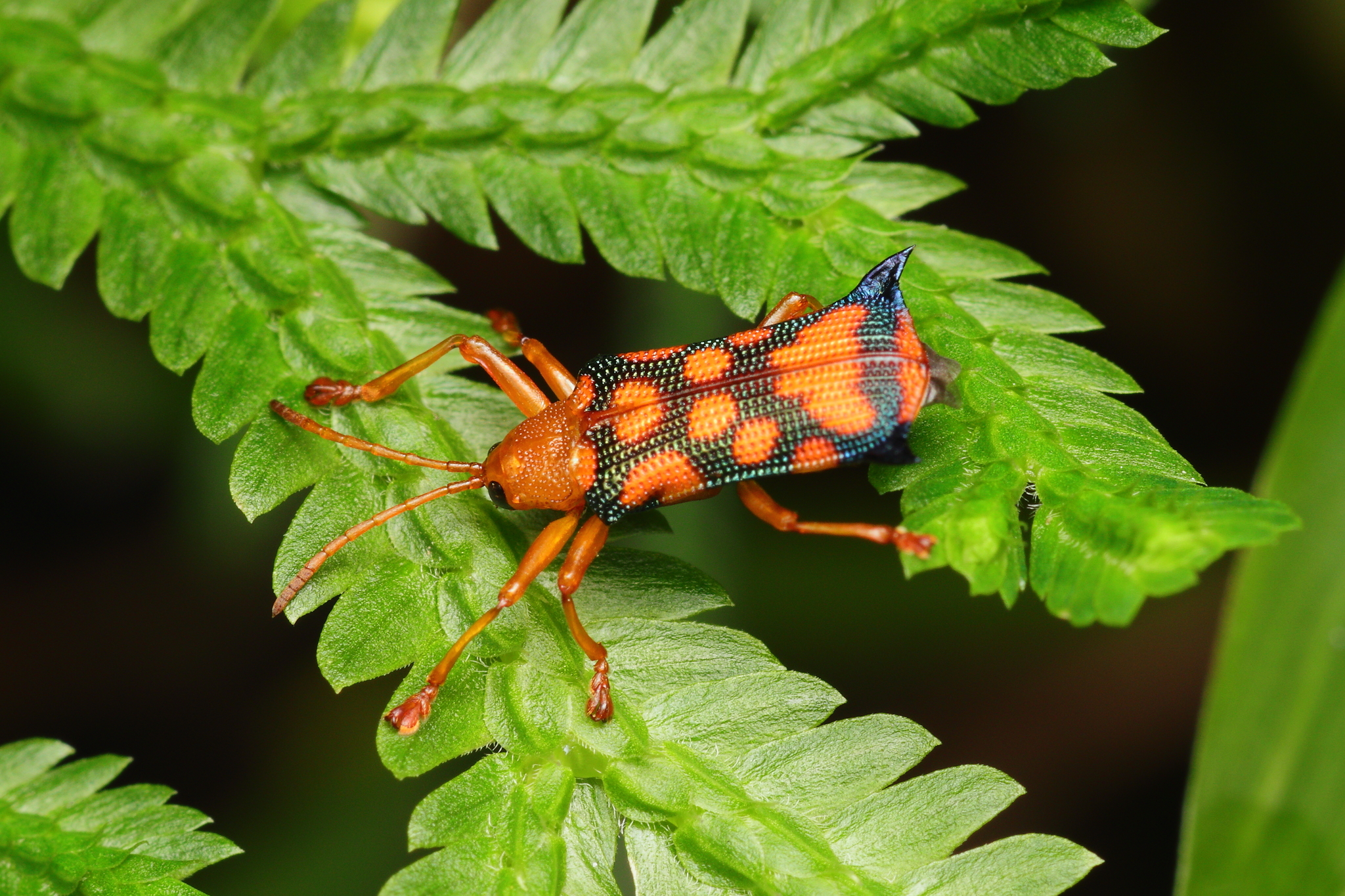

Scientific classification
- Kingdom: Animalia
- Phylum: Arthropoda
- Class: Insecta
- Order: Coleoptera
- Suborder: Polyphaga
- Infraorder: Cucujiformia
- Family: Chrysomelidae
- Genus: Sceloenopla
- Species: S. pulcherrima

Binomial name
- Sceloenopla pulcherrima (Baly, 1858)

Synonyms
- Cephalodonta pulcherrima Baly, 1858

= Sceloenopla pulcherrima =

Species of beetle

Sceloenopla pulcherrima is a species of beetle of the family Chrysomelidae. It is found in Brazil and Paraguay.

== Description ==
Adults are broadly elongate, slightly diluted behind, subdepressed and pale rufo-fulvous. The elytra have their posterior angles produced almost directly outwards into a flattened, slightly curved, acute black spine. The elytra are bright metallic green, stained with fuscous behind, and elytron each with eight pale yellowish-white spots.

== Life history ==
The recorded host plants for this species are Rutaceae species.
