= Sceloenopla westwoodii =

Scientific classification
- Kingdom: Animalia
- Phylum: Arthropoda
- Class: Insecta
- Order: Coleoptera
- Suborder: Polyphaga
- Infraorder: Cucujiformia
- Family: Chrysomelidae
- Genus: Sceloenopla
- Species: S. westwoodii

Binomial name
- Sceloenopla westwoodii (Baly, 1858)

Synonyms
- Cephalodonta westwoodii Baly, 1858; Cephalodonta (Pseudispa) westwoodii testaceonotata Pic, 1934

Species of beetle

Sceloenopla westwoodii is a species of beetle of the family Chrysomelidae. It is found in Colombia and Venezuela.

== Description ==
Adults are elongate, parallel, subdepressed along the back and bright fusco-fulcous. The antennae and tarsi are black, while the thorax and elytra are bright metallic green.

== Life history ==
No host plant has been documented for this species.
