= Sceloenopla rubivittata =

Scientific classification
- Kingdom: Animalia
- Phylum: Arthropoda
- Class: Insecta
- Order: Coleoptera
- Suborder: Polyphaga
- Infraorder: Cucujiformia
- Family: Chrysomelidae
- Genus: Sceloenopla
- Species: S. rubivittata

Binomial name
- Sceloenopla rubivittata Staines, 2002

Species of beetle

Sceloenopla rubivittata is a species of beetle of the family Chrysomelidae. It is found in Costa Rica.

== Description ==
Adults reach a length of about 7-7.1 mm. They are brownish-yellow. The elytra has the suture, a stripe and the base of the exterior apical angles ruby-red.

== Life history ==
No host plant has been documented for this species.

== Etymology ==
The species name is derived from the Latin word rubinus (meaning ruby) and vitta (meaning stripe) and refers to the ruby-red stripe on the elytra.
