= Sceloenopla obsoleta =

Scientific classification
- Kingdom: Animalia
- Phylum: Arthropoda
- Class: Insecta
- Order: Coleoptera
- Suborder: Polyphaga
- Infraorder: Cucujiformia
- Family: Chrysomelidae
- Genus: Sceloenopla
- Species: S. obsoleta

Binomial name
- Sceloenopla obsoleta (Baly, 1858)

Synonyms
- Cephalodonta obsoleta Baly, 1858

Species of beetle

Sceloenopla obsoleta is a species of beetle of the family Chrysomelidae. It is found in Peru.

== Description ==
Adults are elongate, scarcely broader behind and pale fulvous, with the posterior angles of the elytra produced into a large, flattened, acute spine. The eyes and antennae are black, with the five terminal joints of the latter rufo-fuseous. The elytra are pale rufo-violaceous with a faint metallic reflexion, the posterior spine and a short vitta on the shoulders black. Each elytron has four large ill-defined pale fulvous patches covering nearly the whole of the surface.

== Life history ==
No host plant has been documented for this species.
