= Sceloenopla meridionalis =

Scientific classification
- Kingdom: Animalia
- Phylum: Arthropoda
- Clade: Pancrustacea
- Class: Insecta
- Order: Coleoptera
- Suborder: Polyphaga
- Infraorder: Cucujiformia
- Family: Chrysomelidae
- Genus: Sceloenopla
- Species: S. meridionalis

Binomial name
- Sceloenopla meridionalis (Weise, 1910)

Synonyms
- Cephalodonta (Microdonta) meridionalis Weise, 1910; Cephalodonta (Microdonta) elevata Baly, 1858 (not Fabricius); Cephalodonta (Microdonta) uhmanni Pic, 1929; Sceloenopla (Microdonta) uhmanni diversa Pic, 1929; Sceloenopla (Microdonta) uhmanni submarginata Pic, 1929; Sceloenopla (Microdonta) uhmanni subsuturalis Pic, 1929; Sceloenopla (Microdonta) uhmanni hebetata Uhmann, 1937

Species of beetle

Sceloenopla meridionalis is a species of beetle of the family Chrysomelidae. It is found in Bolivia, Brazil (Goiás, Mato Grosso) and Peru.

== Life history ==
No host plant has been documented for this species.
