= Sceloenopla apicicornis =

Scientific classification
- Kingdom: Animalia
- Phylum: Arthropoda
- Clade: Pancrustacea
- Class: Insecta
- Order: Coleoptera
- Suborder: Polyphaga
- Infraorder: Cucujiformia
- Family: Chrysomelidae
- Genus: Sceloenopla
- Species: S. apicicornis

Binomial name
- Sceloenopla apicicornis (Guérin-Méneville, 1844)

Synonyms
- Cephalodonta (Microdonta) apicicornis Guérin-Méneville, 1844; Sceloenopla (Microdonta) apicicornis perroudi Pic, 1934

Species of beetle

Sceloenopla apicicornis is a species of beetle of the family Chrysomelidae. It is found in Colombia.

== Life history ==
No host plant has been documented for this species.
