= Sceloenopla femoralis =

Scientific classification
- Kingdom: Animalia
- Phylum: Arthropoda
- Clade: Pancrustacea
- Class: Insecta
- Order: Coleoptera
- Suborder: Polyphaga
- Infraorder: Cucujiformia
- Family: Chrysomelidae
- Genus: Sceloenopla
- Species: S. femoralis

Binomial name
- Sceloenopla femoralis (Weise, 1910)

Synonyms
- Cephalodonta (Microdonta) femoralis Weise, 1910; Cephalodonta (Microdonta) femoralis funesta Weise, 1910

Species of beetle

Sceloenopla femoralis is a species of beetle of the family Chrysomelidae. It is found in Colombia.

== Life history ==
No host plant has been documented for this species.
