= Sceloenopla nigropicta =

Scientific classification
- Kingdom: Animalia
- Phylum: Arthropoda
- Class: Insecta
- Order: Coleoptera
- Suborder: Polyphaga
- Infraorder: Cucujiformia
- Family: Chrysomelidae
- Genus: Sceloenopla
- Species: S. nigropicta

Binomial name
- Sceloenopla nigropicta Staines, 2002

Species of beetle

Sceloenopla nigropicta is a species of beetle of the family Chrysomelidae. It is found in Costa Rica.

== Description ==
Adults reach a length of about 8.7 mm. They are yellowish-brown, the head with a medial longitudinal black vitta and the pronotum with a longitudinal black vitta and black lateral margins. The elytra have a row of black punctures and the apical one-third is also black.

== Life history ==
The host plant is unknown, but the species has been collected from Virola koschnyi.

== Etymology ==
The species name is derived from the Latin word nigro (meaning black) and picta (meaning painted) and refers to the black markings on the body.
