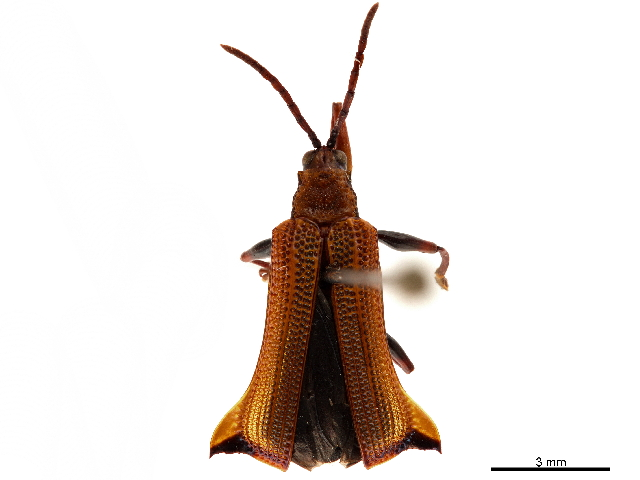

Scientific classification
- Kingdom: Animalia
- Phylum: Arthropoda
- Class: Insecta
- Order: Coleoptera
- Suborder: Polyphaga
- Infraorder: Cucujiformia
- Family: Chrysomelidae
- Genus: Sceloenopla
- Species: S. antennata

Binomial name
- Sceloenopla antennata (Baly, 1885)

Synonyms
- Cephalodonta antennata Baly, 1885

= Sceloenopla antennata =

Species of beetle

Sceloenopla antennata is a species of beetle of the family Chrysomelidae. It is found in Costa Rica.

== Description ==
The vertex is smooth and impunctate and the front is impressed with a few deep punctures and the medial line with a longitudinal groove. The antennae are more than half the length of the body. The thorax is not broader than long, the sides nearly parallel at the base, obtusely angulate behind the middle, then converging and sinuate to the apex, and the anterior angle armed with an oblique, subacute, setiferous tooth. The elytra are broader than the thorax, the sides nearly parallel, slightly enlarged towards the hinder angle (the latter dilated laterally into a triangular spinose process, the apex of which is produced directly backwards, its outer margin being convex, and its hinder one concave), irregularly serrulate, and edged with blackish-piceous. Each elytron has ten, at the extreme base eleven, rows of large deep punctures, the fourth interspace from the suture costate.

== Life history ==
No host plant has been documented for this species.
