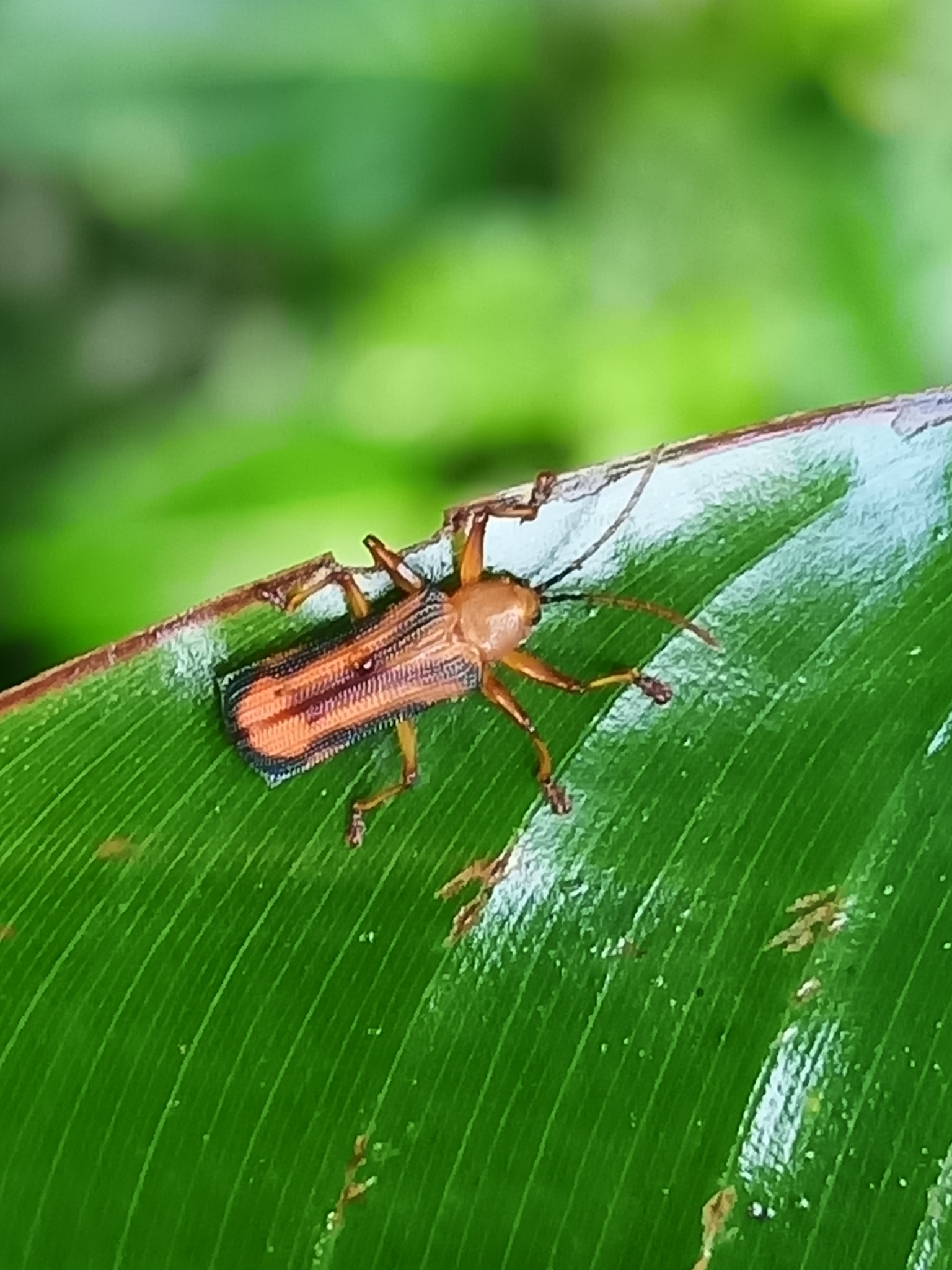

Scientific classification
- Kingdom: Animalia
- Phylum: Arthropoda
- Class: Insecta
- Order: Coleoptera
- Suborder: Polyphaga
- Infraorder: Cucujiformia
- Family: Chrysomelidae
- Genus: Sceloenopla
- Species: S. laeta

Binomial name
- Sceloenopla laeta (Baly, 1858)

Synonyms
- Cephalodonta laeta Baly, 1858

= Sceloenopla laeta =

Species of beetle

Sceloenopla laeta is a species of beetle of the family Chrysomelidae. It is found in French Guiana.

== Description ==
Adults are elongate, parallel, subdepressed along the back, and bright blackish-fulvous. The antennae are slender, subincrassate towards the apex and pitchy. The elytra are bright metallic green, the suture in front, an elongate marginal patch behind the middle, and a broad vitta on the disc, which is dilated at its apex, bright rufo-fulvous.

== Life history ==
No host plant has been documented for this species.
