= Sceloenopla pulchella =

Scientific classification
- Kingdom: Animalia
- Phylum: Arthropoda
- Class: Insecta
- Order: Coleoptera
- Suborder: Polyphaga
- Infraorder: Cucujiformia
- Family: Chrysomelidae
- Genus: Sceloenopla
- Species: S. pulchella

Binomial name
- Sceloenopla pulchella (Baly, 1858)

Synonyms
- Cephalodonta pulchella Baly, 1858

Species of beetle

Sceloenopla pulchella is a species of beetle of the family Chrysomelidae. It is found in Brazil (Amazonas).

== Description ==
Adults are elongate, parallel, moderately convex, subdepressed along the back and rufo-fulvous. The antennae are black and the elytra are bright metallic green, each with five large fulvous spots which nearly cover their whole surface.

== Life history ==
No host plant has been documented for this species.
