= Sceloenopla bidentata =

Scientific classification
- Kingdom: Animalia
- Phylum: Arthropoda
- Class: Insecta
- Order: Coleoptera
- Suborder: Polyphaga
- Infraorder: Cucujiformia
- Family: Chrysomelidae
- Genus: Sceloenopla
- Species: S. bidentata

Binomial name
- Sceloenopla bidentata Staines, 2002

Species of beetle

Sceloenopla bidentata is a species of beetle of the family Chrysomelidae. It is found in Costa Rica.

== Description ==
Adults reach a length of about 6.7-7.3 mm. The head is black and the pronotum is orangish with a black longitudinal medial vitta and a black lateral vittae. The elytra are orangish, with the apical one-fourth black.

== Life history ==
No host plant has been documented for this species.

== Etymology ==
The species name is derived from Latin bi (meaning two) and denta (meaning tooth) and refers to the two teeth on the apical margins of the elytra.
