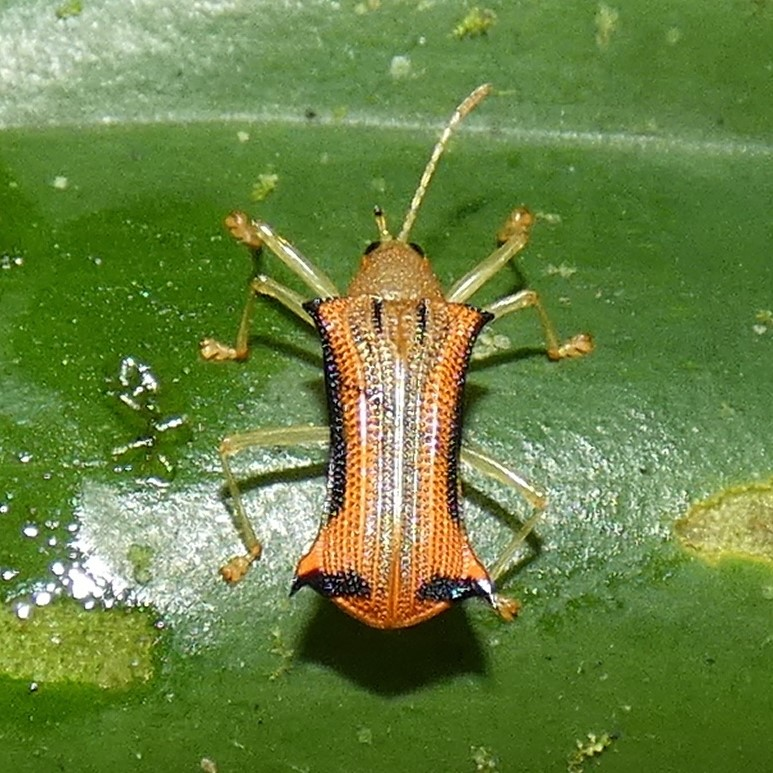

Scientific classification
- Kingdom: Animalia
- Phylum: Arthropoda
- Class: Insecta
- Order: Coleoptera
- Suborder: Polyphaga
- Infraorder: Cucujiformia
- Family: Chrysomelidae
- Genus: Sceloenopla
- Species: S. apicispina

Binomial name
- Sceloenopla apicispina Staines, 2002

= Sceloenopla apicispina =

Species of beetle

Sceloenopla apicispina is a species of beetle of the family Chrysomelidae. It is found in Costa Rica.

== Description ==
Adults reach a length of about 7.7-7.9 mm. They are brownish-yellow, the elytra with the humeral and exterior apical angles margined with black, and the lateral margins with black aeneous vitta.

== Life history ==
No host plant has been documented for this species.

== Etymology ==
The species name is derived from Latin apici (meaning small) and spina (meaning spine) and refers to the small spine in the exterior apical angles of the elytra.
