= Sceloenopla tarsata =

Scientific classification
- Kingdom: Animalia
- Phylum: Arthropoda
- Class: Insecta
- Order: Coleoptera
- Suborder: Polyphaga
- Infraorder: Cucujiformia
- Family: Chrysomelidae
- Genus: Sceloenopla
- Species: S. tarsata

Binomial name
- Sceloenopla tarsata (Baly, 1858)

Synonyms
- Cephalodonta tarsata Baly, 1858

Species of beetle

Sceloenopla tarsata is a species of beetle of the family Chrysomelidae. It is found in Colombia.

== Description ==
Adults are somewhat wedge-shaped, subdepressed and pale fulvous above, beneath shining black. The antennae are black and the eyes piceous. The head, thorax, thighs and tibiae are fulvous.

== Life history ==
No host plant has been documented for this species.
