= Sceloenopla fraterna =

Scientific classification
- Kingdom: Animalia
- Phylum: Arthropoda
- Class: Insecta
- Order: Coleoptera
- Suborder: Polyphaga
- Infraorder: Cucujiformia
- Family: Chrysomelidae
- Genus: Sceloenopla
- Species: S. fraterna

Binomial name
- Sceloenopla fraterna (Baly, 1885)

Synonyms
- Cephalodonta fraterna Baly, 1885

Species of beetle

Sceloenopla fraterna is a species of beetle of the family Chrysomelidae. It is found in Nicaragua.

== Description ==
The form, sculpture, and coloration is very similar to Sceloenopla ampliata, but the thorax is narrower, rather more conical, and distinctly bisinuate on the sides. The elytra are more broadly dilated behind the middle, the posterior angle being armed with a small tooth, the apical margin is more broadly emarginate at the suture, and the sutural angle, although acute, is not produced into a distinct tooth.

== Life history ==
No host plant has been documented for this species.
