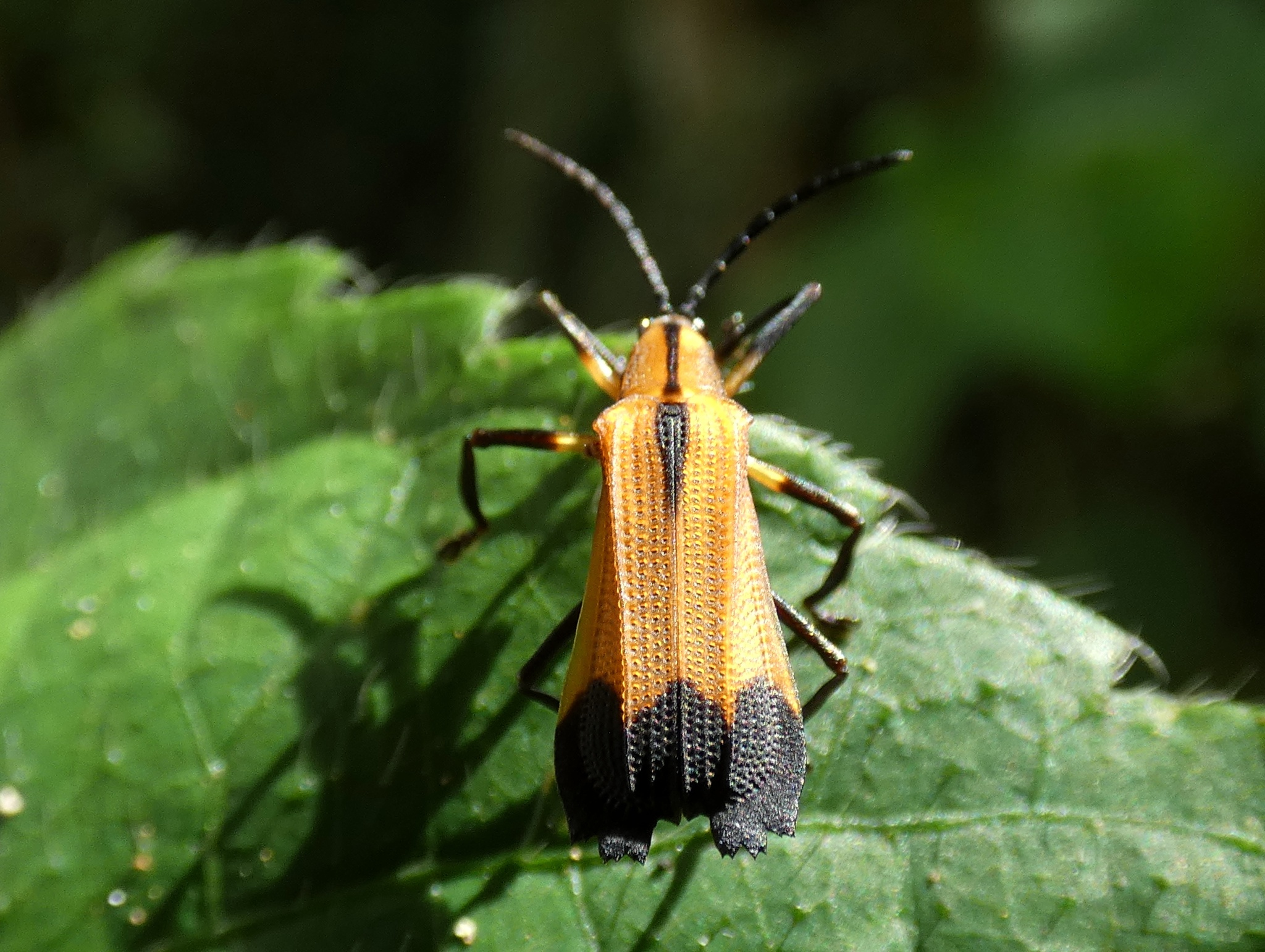

Scientific classification
- Kingdom: Animalia
- Phylum: Arthropoda
- Class: Insecta
- Order: Coleoptera
- Suborder: Polyphaga
- Infraorder: Cucujiformia
- Family: Chrysomelidae
- Genus: Sceloenopla
- Species: S. ampliata

Binomial name
- Sceloenopla ampliata (Baly, 1885)

Synonyms
- Cephalodonta ampliata Baly, 1885

= Sceloenopla ampliata =

Species of beetle

Sceloenopla ampliata is a species of beetle of the family Chrysomelidae. It is found in Nicaragua.

== Description ==
The body is elongate and broadly wedge-shaped. The front is stained with piceous, rugose-punctate, armed between the antennae with a minute tooth. The antennae are nearly three fourths the length of the body and slender. The third to the seventh joints compressed and cristate. The thorax is scarcely broader than long at the base, the sides nearly straight behind the middle, converging and sinuate between the latter and the apex, the apical angle armed with an acute transversely convex, slightly but distinctly excavated on the hinder disc, closely and coarsely punctured. The scutellum is narrowly oblong, truncate, sinuate on the sides. The elytra are rather broader than the base of the thorax and broadly wedge-shaped, the outer limb broadly dilated, the dilatation commencing at the shoulder and regularly increasing to the posterior angle, the latter broadly rounded, the angle itself obsolete. The apices are rounded, conjointly quadrate-emarginate at the suture, the sutural angle armed with a stout acute tooth. The lateral margin is entire, the apical margin finely serrulate and the dilated limb is impressed with a number of deep transverse grooves, their direction following the curvature of the outer border, on the sides being horizontal, those near the hinder angle oblique, and those at the apex perpendicular. Each elytron has ten, at the extreme base eleven, rows of deep punctures. The sutural margin and the fourth interspace are costate.

== Life history ==
No host plant has been documented for this species.
