= Sceloenopla posticata =

Scientific classification
- Kingdom: Animalia
- Phylum: Arthropoda
- Class: Insecta
- Order: Coleoptera
- Suborder: Polyphaga
- Infraorder: Cucujiformia
- Family: Chrysomelidae
- Genus: Sceloenopla
- Species: S. posticata

Binomial name
- Sceloenopla posticata (Baly, 1885)

Synonyms
- Cephalodonta posticata Baly, 1885

Species of beetle

Sceloenopla posticata is a species of beetle of the family Chrysomelidae. It is found in Panama.

== Description ==
The head and antennae are the same as those of Sceloenopla obscurovittata, but the thorax is more transverse, its disc less deeply impressed at the base, and more closely punctured on the middle than in that species. The elytra are broader in proportion to their length than in S. obscurovittata. The posterior angle is produced laterally into a flattened triangular process, the outer margin of which is convex and the hinder one concave, its apex very acute and produced directly backwards and the apical margin obtuse. The disc has ten, the extreme base eleven, rows of punctures. The suture, together with the second and fourth interspaces, are thickened and subcostate. The humeral callus is laterally produced, the submarginal vitta, which extends considerably beyond the middle of the elytron, is dilated at its base, and covers both the apex of the humeral callus and the humeral margin. The transverse stripe commences at the outer edge of the posterior angle, runs along its hinder border, and extends inwards as far as the middle of the disc.

== Life history ==
No host plant has been documented for this species.
