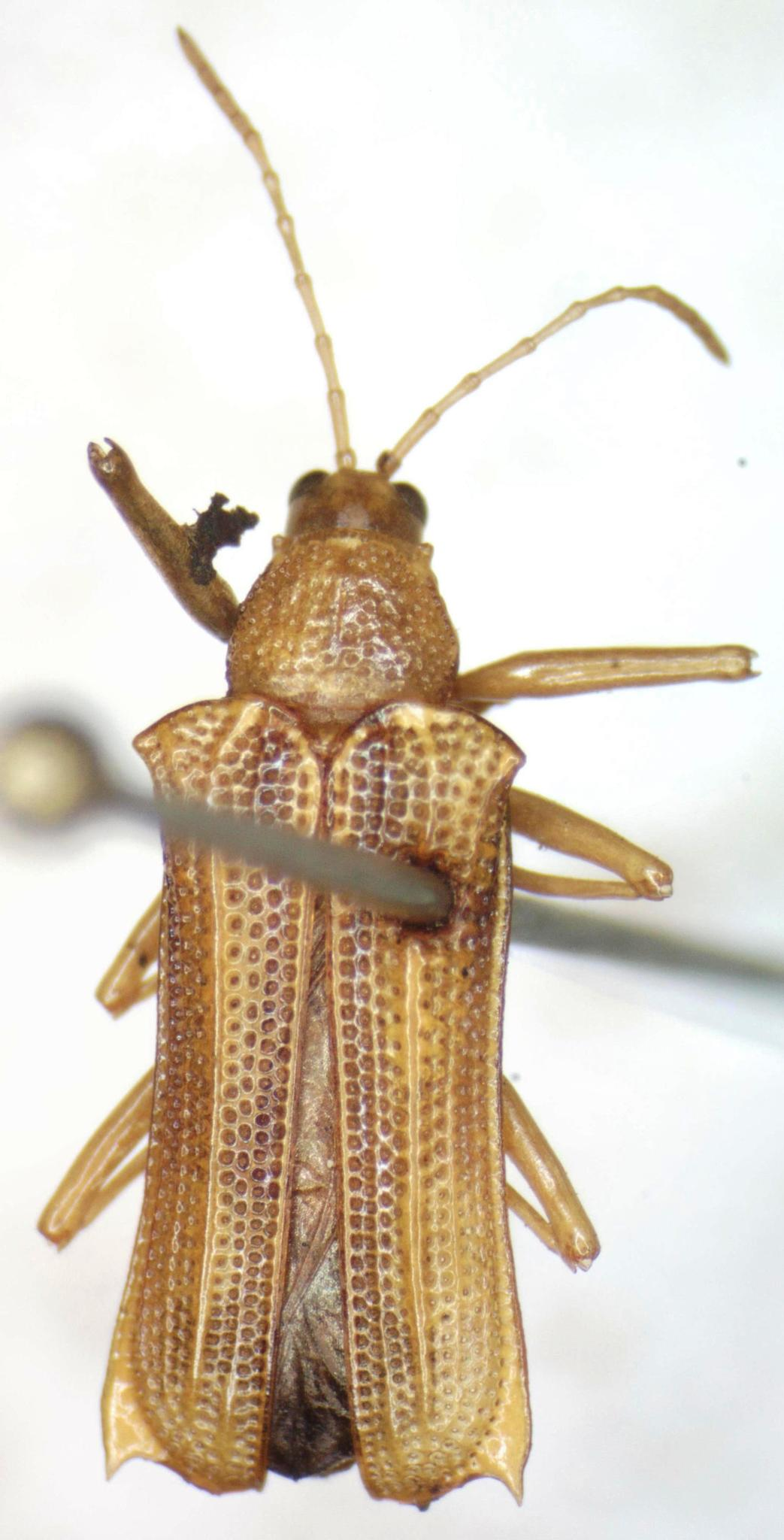

Scientific classification
- Kingdom: Animalia
- Phylum: Arthropoda
- Class: Insecta
- Order: Coleoptera
- Suborder: Polyphaga
- Infraorder: Cucujiformia
- Family: Chrysomelidae
- Genus: Sceloenopla
- Species: S. obscurovittata

Binomial name
- Sceloenopla obscurovittata (Baly, 1885)

Synonyms
- Cephalodonta obscurovittata Baly, 1885

= Sceloenopla obscurovittata =

Species of beetle

Sceloenopla obscurovittata is a species of beetle of the family Chrysomelidae. It is found in Costa Rica, Nicaragua and Panama.

== Description ==
The front is smooth and impressed with a longitudinal groove. The antennae are slender, filiform and very slightly thickened at the apex. The thorax is broader than long, the sides straight and parallel at the base, angulate behind the middle, then obliquely converging to the apex, the anterior angle armed with a stout oblique tooth. The upper surface is transversely convex, excavated transversely on the hinder disc, impressed with large foveolate punctures, crowded on the sides, less closely placed on the middle. The elytra are broader than the thorax, parallel and slightly dilated near the hinder angle, the latter armed with an acute flattened spine, the apex of which is produced directly backwards. The disc of each elytron has ten rows of large deep punctures. The suture and the fourth interspace are costate. The humeral callus is laterally produced and acute.

== Life history ==
The recorded host plant for this species is Philodendron radiatum radiatum.
