= Sceloenopla smithii =

Scientific classification
- Kingdom: Animalia
- Phylum: Arthropoda
- Class: Insecta
- Order: Coleoptera
- Suborder: Polyphaga
- Infraorder: Cucujiformia
- Family: Chrysomelidae
- Genus: Sceloenopla
- Species: S. smithii

Binomial name
- Sceloenopla smithii (Baly, 1858)

Synonyms
- Cephalodonta smithii Baly, 1858

Species of beetle

Sceloenopla smithii is a species of beetle of the family Chrysomelidae. It is found in Brazil (Amazonas).

== Description ==
Aduts are very similar to Sceloenopla cognata in form and colouring, but the whole surface is much less distinctly granulose and the antennae are less perfoliate, with the third joint scarcely longer than the fourth, the two terminal joints are fulvous and covered with white pubescence. The thorax is shorter, as broad as long at the base and the apical margin of the elytra is scarcely dilated, oblique, its outer edge indistinctly toothed.

== Life history ==
No host plant has been documented for this species.
