= Sceloenopla deyrollei =

Scientific classification
- Kingdom: Animalia
- Phylum: Arthropoda
- Clade: Pancrustacea
- Class: Insecta
- Order: Coleoptera
- Suborder: Polyphaga
- Infraorder: Cucujiformia
- Family: Chrysomelidae
- Genus: Sceloenopla
- Species: S. deyrollei

Binomial name
- Sceloenopla deyrollei (Baly, 1858)

Synonyms
- Cephalodonta deyrollei Baly, 1858

Species of beetle

Sceloenopla deyrollei is a species of beetle of the family Chrysomelidae. It is found in South America.

== Description ==
Adults are very similar in shape and sculpturing to Sceloenopla serraticornis. They are black and subopaque. The apex of the antennae, a broad marginal stripe on the elytra, extending from the base to beyond their middle, and the thorax, are all fulvous, the latter with the lateral border and an oblong patch in the middle of the disc, confluent with the basal margin, black.

== Life history ==
No host plant has been documented for this species.
