= Sceloenopla cognata =

Scientific classification
- Kingdom: Animalia
- Phylum: Arthropoda
- Class: Insecta
- Order: Coleoptera
- Suborder: Polyphaga
- Infraorder: Cucujiformia
- Family: Chrysomelidae
- Genus: Sceloenopla
- Species: S. cognata

Binomial name
- Sceloenopla cognata (Baly, 1858)

Synonyms
- Cephalodonta cognata Baly, 1858

Species of beetle

Sceloenopla cognata is a species of beetle of the family Chrysomelidae. It is found in Brazil (Amazonas).

== Description ==
Aduts are very similar to Sceloenopla serraticornis. They are black, with the lower half of the face, two spots on the vertex, a submarginal vitta on either side the thorax, and a short humeral stripe on the shoulders (confluent with the vitta on the thorax), all fulvous. They are shining black beneath and there is a large bright fulvous patch on the breast and the basal half of the thighs.

== Life history ==
No host plant has been documented for this species.
