= Sceloenopla serraticornis =

Scientific classification
- Kingdom: Animalia
- Phylum: Arthropoda
- Clade: Pancrustacea
- Class: Insecta
- Order: Coleoptera
- Suborder: Polyphaga
- Infraorder: Cucujiformia
- Family: Chrysomelidae
- Genus: Sceloenopla
- Species: S. serraticornis

Binomial name
- Sceloenopla serraticornis (Fabricius, 1792)

Synonyms
- Hispa serraticornis Fabricius, 1792; Cephalodonta serraticornis

Species of beetle

Sceloenopla serraticornis is a species of beetle of the family Chrysomelidae. It is found in French Guiana.

== Description ==
Adults are elongate, subparallel, scarcely broader behind, subdepressed and black. The lower half of the face, two spots on the vertex behind the eyes, a broad submarginal vitta on either side of the thorax, together with its anterior margin, and a short humeral stripe on the elytra, are all fulvous.

== Life history ==
No host plant has been documented for this species.
