= Sceloenopla proxima =

Scientific classification
- Kingdom: Animalia
- Phylum: Arthropoda
- Class: Insecta
- Order: Coleoptera
- Suborder: Polyphaga
- Infraorder: Cucujiformia
- Family: Chrysomelidae
- Genus: Sceloenopla
- Species: S. proxima

Binomial name
- Sceloenopla proxima (Baly, 1885)

Synonyms
- Cephalodonta proxima Baly, 1885; Sceloenopla (Microdonta) testaceipennis Pic, 1929; Sceloenopla testaceipennis

Species of beetle

Sceloenopla proxima is a species of beetle of the family Chrysomelidae. It is found in Costa Rica and Nicaragua.

== Description ==
The head sculptured as in Sceloenopla erudita. The antennae are three fourths the length of the body, with the two lower joints short and equal, the third to the seventh compressed and dilated, perfoliate, the third longer than the preceding two united, the fourth and fifth each shorter than the third and equal. The thorax is rather longer than broad, the sides slightly converging from the base to the apex, bisinuate and distinctly angulate. The upper surface is closely rugose-punctate, obsoletely torulose on the sides and apex. The elytra are as in S. erudita.

== Life history ==
No host plant has been documented for this species.
