= Sceloenopla erudita =

Scientific classification
- Kingdom: Animalia
- Phylum: Arthropoda
- Class: Insecta
- Order: Coleoptera
- Suborder: Polyphaga
- Infraorder: Cucujiformia
- Family: Chrysomelidae
- Genus: Sceloenopla
- Species: S. erudita

Binomial name
- Sceloenopla erudita (Baly, 1885)

Synonyms
- Cephalodonta erudita Baly, 1885; Sceloenopla (Microdonta) nevermanni Uhmann, 1930

Species of beetle

Sceloenopla erudita is a species of beetle of the family Chrysomelidae. It is found in Belize, Colombia, Costa Rica, Mexico (Tabasco, Veracruz), Nicaragua, Panama and Venezuela.

== Description ==
The front is impressed with an oblong fovea. The antennae are nearly three fourths the length of the body, slender and filiform, the joints obsoletely compressed, the basal one short, the second, third, and fourth nearly equal in length, each one half longer than the first. The thorax is not longer than broad, the sides nearly parallel, slightly sinuate from the base to the middle, then sinuate and obliquely converging to the apex, the anterior angle armed with an obtuse tooth, above subcylindrical, slightly depressed transversely at the base, closely and coarsely punctured. Scutellum subquadrate. The elytra are parallel, slightly dilated towards the posterior angle, the apex of each elytron armed with two large flattened teeth (one acute at the posterior angle, its apex looking directly backwards, the other irregular, placed near the suture). Each elytron has eleven irregular rows of punctures at the extreme base, on the rest of the surface ten, the fourth inter space from the suture is costate. The humeral callus is flattened above, laterally produced, its apex acute.

== Life history ==
The recorded host plants for this species are Anthurium and Cluspania species.
