= Sceloenopla octopunctata =

Scientific classification
- Kingdom: Animalia
- Phylum: Arthropoda
- Class: Insecta
- Order: Coleoptera
- Suborder: Polyphaga
- Infraorder: Cucujiformia
- Family: Chrysomelidae
- Genus: Sceloenopla
- Species: S. octopunctata

Binomial name
- Sceloenopla octopunctata (Baly, 1858)

Synonyms
- Cephalodonta octopunctata Baly, 1858

Species of beetle

Sceloenopla octopunctata is a species of beetle of the family Chrysomelidae. It is found in Brazil (Amazonas).

== Description ==
Adults are subdepressed, subcuneiform and obscure rufous. The four terminal joints of the antennae are black, closely covered with adpressed cinereous pubescence. The bright metallic violaceous elytra are armed at the posterior angle with a flattened purplish-black spine. Each elytron has four large fulvo-testaceous spots.

== Life history ==
No host plant has been documented for this species.
